= Éloi Laurent Despeaux =

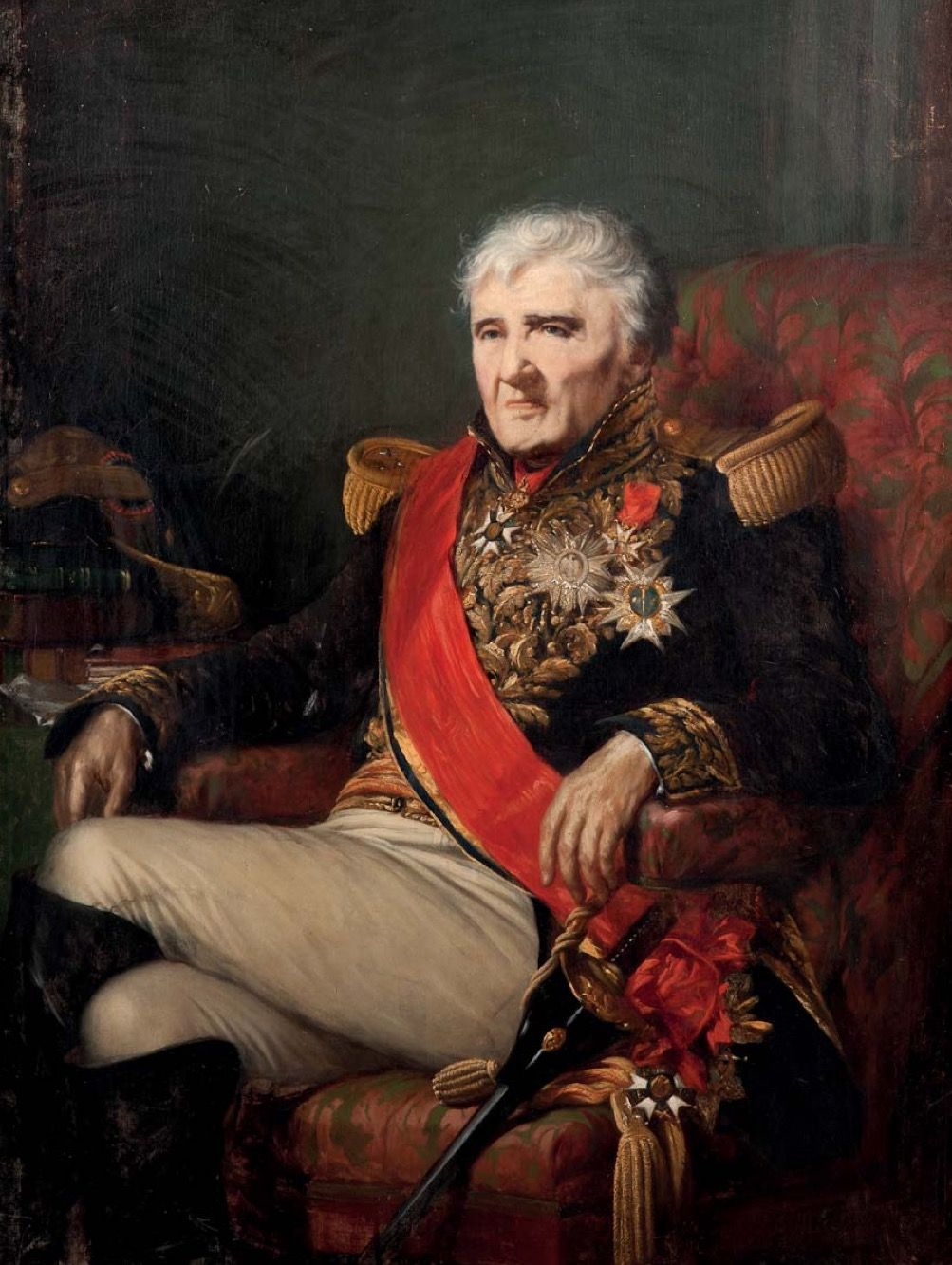
- Jean-François Brémond, Portrait of Baron General Despeaux in uniform, wearing the insignia of the Legion of Honor, the Order of Saint Louis and the Order of the Sword, 1856
- Born: 14 October 1761; Malassine near Beauvais, France
- Died: 23 October 1856 (aged 95) Paris, France
- Allegiance: France
- Branch: Infantry
- Service years: 1776–1815
- Rank: General of Division
- Conflicts: War of the First Coalition; Battle of Jemappes; Battle of Famars; Battle of Grandreng; Battle of Erquelinnes; Siege of Ypres; Invasion of Holland; War of the Fifth Coalition; Walcheren Campaign
- Awards: Légion d'Honneur, KC 1805, OC 1814, CC 1821, GO 1853, GC 1856; Order of Saint-Louis, Chevalier 1814; Order of the Sword
- Other work: Baron, 1819

Éloi Laurent Despeaux (14 October 1761 – 23 October 1856) commanded a combat infantry division during the French Revolution. He joined the French Royal Army in 1776 and became a non-commissioned officer by 1791 when he reentered civilian life. The following year he joined a volunteer battalion and fought at Jemappes. He was badly wounded at Famars in May 1793 and was appointed general of brigade in the Army of the North in September that year. After being wounded again he was promoted general of division in March 1794.

After commanding a division at Grandreng and Erquelinnes in May 1794, he was transferred to another division which he led in operations around Ypres in June. During the winter of 1794 he participated in the invasion of the Dutch Republic. After garrison duty in Holland he commanded interior posts in France during the Napoleonic Wars. The exception came in 1809 when he led a reserve infantry division. He lived long enough to be awarded the Grand Cross of the Légion d'Honneur in 1856 in the reign of Napoleon III before dying a few months later at the age of 95.

== Early career ==
Despeaux was born on 14 October 1761 at Malassine. This hamlet was located near Beauvais in the Oise department. His father Laurent Despeaux was a woodcutter who married Marguerite Petit, his second wife, on 25 November 1759. Despeaux enlisted in the Flandre Infantry Regiment on 2 November 1776 at the age of 15. He was promoted corporal on 15 June 1780 and sergeant on 20 May 1784. He was at the Palace of Versailles when the mob came for King Louis XVI.

== French Revolution ==
Despeaux took a leave of absence from his regiment in August 1791 before emerging as adjutant-major in the 9th Battalion of the Nord National Guard on 25 October 1792. Another source stated that he was not appointed adjutant-major until after the Battle of Jemappes, a French victory on 6 November 1792. A 1793 order of battle for the Army of the North listed the 9th Nord Battalion, but the month and day were not given. The French were defeated by the Coalition in the Battle of Famars on 23 May 1793. After greatly distinguishing himself and suffering a serious wound, he received a battlefield promotion to chef de bataillon (major). However, a second source stated that he became commanding officer of the 9th Nord on 28 April 1793. He was promoted to general of brigade on 3 September of the same year. He was sent on a mission along the Sambre River in the course of which he was wounded again. Soon after, he was elevated to the rank of general of division on 19 March 1794.

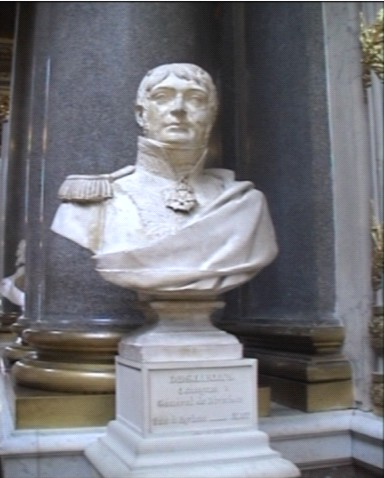
Jacques Desjardin

At the beginning of May 1794, Despeaux's 7,042-man division was at Limont-Fontaine guarding the Sambre between Berlaimont and Maubeuge. The French plan was to form the right wing of the Army of the North under Jacques Desjardin and the Army of the Ardennes under Louis Charbonnier into a 60,000-strong army and send it toward Mons. Unfortunately, the overall commander Jean-Charles Pichegru neglected to appoint a single commander of the army and the generals were hampered by two of the most arrogant representatives on mission in Louis Antoine de Saint-Just and Philippe-François-Joseph Le Bas. The results were not happy and the army suffered three defeats between 11 May and 3 June. Despeaux's division was joined to the divisions of Desjardin (14,075 men), Jacques Fromentin (15,719 men) and François Muller (6,815 men) of the Army of the North and Philippe Joseph Jacob's 19,000-man division of the Army of the Ardennes. In Despeaux's division the regular troops consisted of the 1st Battalions of the 17th and 25th Line Infantry Demi-brigades, 127 horsemen of the 6th Cavalry and 83 gunners from the 3rd and 6th Artillery. His volunteer battalions were the 1st Loiret, 1st Hainaut Chasseurs, 3rd Meurthe, 4th and 9th Nord and 6th Pas-de-Calais. All infantry battalions numbered between 783 and 919 soldiers.

Muller assumed command of Desjardin's division while his own division remained as the Maubeuge garrison. On the morning of 10 May 1794 the French army launched its offensive in seven columns with Despeaux's division on the far left marching towards Hantes. After serious fighting near Merbes-le-Château on the 12th, the Coalition forces abandoned the entrenched camp at Hantes and Despeaux's troops camped near Solre-le-Sambre. On 13 May 1794, Franz Wenzel, Graf von Kaunitz-Rietberg and his Coalition army defeated the French in the Battle of Grandreng. Despeaux was in a second line behind Muller's division which attacked Grand-Reng while Fromentin advanced on Croix-lez-Rouveroy to their right. Though the French cannons bogged down in the mud, the infantry of Muller and Despeaux were able to seize a few outlying redoubts while subjected to intense artillery fire and slashing cavalry attacks. The battle raged until the early evening when Kaunitz assembled a mounted force under Michael von Kienmayer and hurled it at the French. This cavalry charge decided the battle and caused the French withdraw south of the Sambre. Charbonnier's Army of the Ardennes failed to intervene while Desjardin's 35,000 troops futilely rushed at Kaunitz's 22,000 men behind entrenchments. One French general later wrote, "We were children in the art of war".

The French recrossed the Sambre on 20 May 1794, with Despeaux's division again taking position in a second line behind Fromentin and Muller, facing west. This time Jean Adam Mayer's division of the Army of the Ardennes was posted on the right flank near Binche. Kaunitz launched an attack at 8:00 am on 21 May and quickly overran Erquelinnes. Desjardin and Jean Baptiste Kléber organized a counterattack which retook the village. Fighting continued until 3:00 pm when Despeaux's division somewhat belatedly advanced with his battalions arrayed in checkerboard formation. At this the Coalition forces withdrew. On 22 May Despeaux was replaced in command of his division by Anne Charles Basset Montaigu. On the 24th Kaunitz beat the French again in the Battle of Erquelinnes, inflicting heavy casualties and capturing 32 artillery pieces.

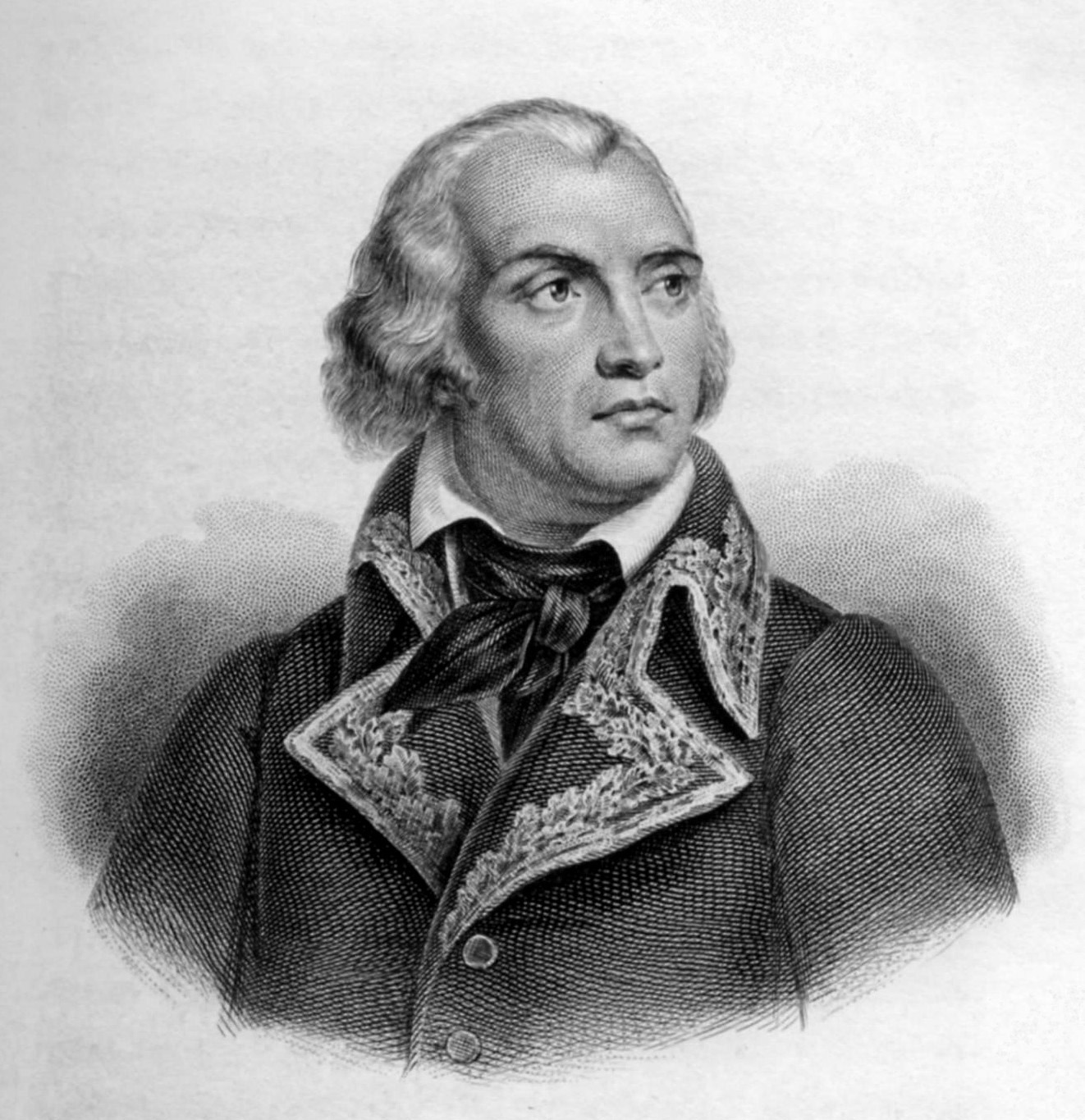
Jean-Charles Pichegru

Despeaux assumed command of a division from the left wing of the Army of the North. Assailed on both left and right wings, the Coalition armies allowed the French to seize the initiative. On 1 June 1794, Jean Victor Marie Moreau's division began the Siege of Ypres. The besieging troops were covered by Joseph Souham's division which was supported by the divisions of Pierre Antoine Michaud on the left and Despeaux on the right. The three covering divisions fought an action at Roeselare on 10 June, driving back a Coalition corps led by François Sébastien Charles Joseph de Croix, Count of Clerfayt. On 13 June Clerfayt launched a surprise attack on Despeaux's division, routing Philippe Joseph Malbrancq's brigade and pushing Jean-Baptiste Salme's brigade back toward Menen (Menin). However, Jacques MacDonald's brigade of Souham's division held off repeated attacks at Hooglede. After six hours, Jan Willem de Winter's brigade came up on MacDonald's left while Salme's rallied brigade moved forward on MacDonald's right. At this, Clerfayt's worn out soldiers withdrew. Ypres surrendered to the French on 18 June.

On 26 June 1794, the French right wing under Jean-Baptiste Jourdan beat the Coalition army at the Battle of Fleurus. By 1 July, Pichegru's army occupied Bruges and on the 10th took Brussels. The next day, the armies of Pichegru and Jordan linked hands. The two armies soon diverged, with Pichegru following the British and Dutch northward while Jourdan turned eastward in pursuit of the Austrians. Pichegru's army occupied Antwerp on 27 July. An order of battle for the Army of the North on 1 September showed Despeaux leading the 4th Division with Salme as the only brigadier. The units included three battalions each of the 38th and 131st Line Infantry Demi-brigades, 3rd Battalion of Tirailleurs, 5th Battalion of Chasseurs, four squadrons of the 19th Cavalry and two squadrons of the 13th Chasseurs à Cheval. On this date the 4th Division numbered 5,432 infantry and 647 cavalry with 283 gunners serving 16 cannons and two howitzers. The fortress of Grave fell to the division on 29 December, but by that time Salme seems to have been in command.

Despeaux was first appointed to command Tournai, then Antwerp. Later he was in charge of Western Brabant where he oversaw the suppression of the religious houses. On 13 June 1795 he was not listed in the organization of chiefs of staff. He was several times put in retirement and then brought back into active service. In 1797 he was governor of Flanders. In 1798 the French Directory named him to command the 18th Military Division at Dijon.

== Empire ==
On 24 April 1805 Despeaux was made a member of the Légion d'Honneur. During the War of the Fifth Coalition in 1809, a Reserve Corps was assembled under Marshal François Christophe de Kellermann with its headquarters at Frankfurt. There were four divisions, the 1st under Olivier Macoux Rivaud de la Raffinière, 2nd under Despeaux, 3rd under Joseph Lagrange and Reserve under Marc Antoine de Beaumont. Despeaux commanded six provisional infantry battalions divided into two brigades, a total of 2,520 soldiers. He was appointed to division command on 8 May 1809. He was assigned to Jean-Andoche Junot's corps but when that general departed, Despeaux assumed command for a time. He spent several days in the fortress during the Siege of Flushing in the Walcheren Campaign. On 20 September 1809 he was assigned to command the 20th Military Division at Périgueux. During the remaining years of the First French Empire he served in various interior posts. He was named Officer of the Légion d'Honneur on 21 January 1814.

== Later career ==
After the First Restoration Despeaux was placed in command of Metz and made a Chevalier of the Order of Saint-Louis. On 25 March 1815 he was appointed governor of Le Quesnoy. After the Second Restoration he was put on the inactive list. After a brief stint of active service for two tours of inspection, he was retired from military service. The king made Despeaux a baron on 11 June 1819 and named him a Commander of the Légion d'Honneur on 1 March 1821. He was also awarded the Swedish Order of the Sword. Despeaux was named Grand Officer of the Légion d'Honneur on 22 August 1853 and awarded the Grand Cross of the Légion d'Honneur on 7 February 1856. He died on 23 October 1856. He is buried in the Père Lachaise Cemetery in the 15th Division along Chemin de Gramont.
