= Siege of Ypres (1794) =

Siege of the War of the First Coalition

Coordinates: 50°51′N 2°53′E

- Part of War of the First Coalition
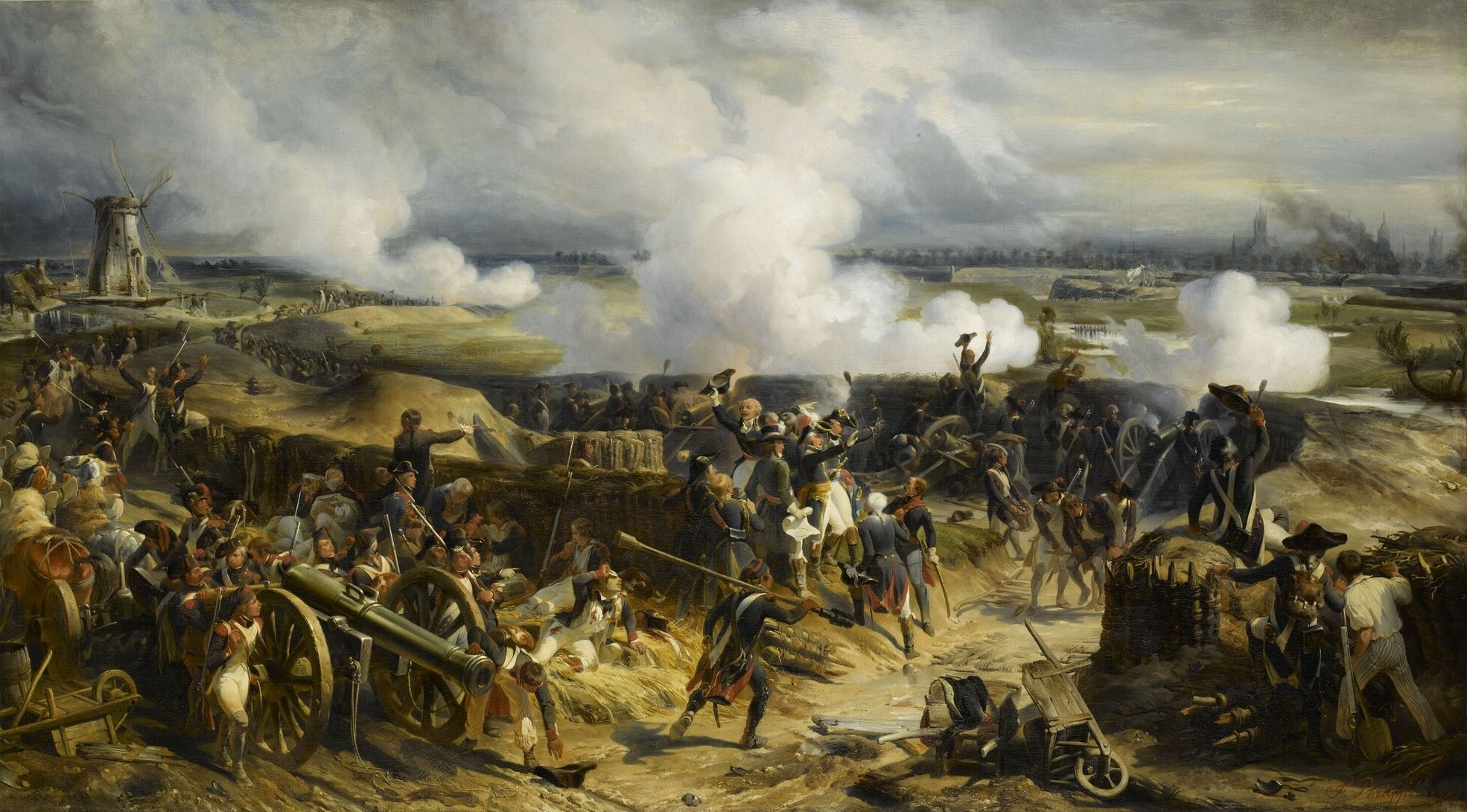
- Capture of Ypres, 17 June 1794 by Henri Félix Emmanuel Philippoteaux (Musée de la Révolution française)
Date	1–18 June 1794
Location	Ypres, Austrian Netherlands
Result	French victory

Belligerents
Republican France	(Habsburg monarchy) Habsburg Austria; Great Britain; Hesse-Kassel (Electorate of Brunswick-Lüneburg) Hanover

Commanders and leaders
(France) Charles Pichegru (France) Joseph Souham (France) Jean Moreau (France) Éloi Despeaux (France) Jacques MacDonald (France) Jean-Baptiste Salme (France) Jan de Winter	(Habsburg monarchy) Count of Clerfayt (Habsburg monarchy) Anton Sztáray (Habsburg monarchy) Paul von Salis (Habsburg monarchy) Wilhelm von Kerpen (Hesse) Heinrich Borcke (Hesse) Georg Lengerke (Electorate of Brunswick-Lüneburg) Rudolf Hammerstein

Units involved
Army of the North	Clerfayt's Corps

Strength
Total: 50,000; Roeselare: 20,000; Hooglede: 24,000	Ypres: 7,000; Roeselare: 20,000; Hooglede: 19,000

Casualties and losses
Ypres: Unknown; Roeselare: 1,000; Hooglede: 1,300, 1 gun	Ypres: 7,000, 12 guns Roeselare: 1,000; Hooglede: 900

The siege of Ypres (1–18 June 1794) saw a Republican French army commanded by Jean-Charles Pichegru invest the fortress of Ypres and its 7,000-man garrison composed of Habsburg Austrians under Paul von Salis and Hessians led by Heinrich von Borcke and Georg von Lengerke. French troops under Joseph Souham fended off three relief attempts by the corps of François Sébastien Charles Joseph de Croix, Count of Clerfayt. Meanwhile, the French besiegers led by Jean Victor Marie Moreau compelled the Coalition defenders to surrender the city. The fighting occurred during the War of the First Coalition, part of the Wars of the French Revolution. In 1794 Ypres was part of the Austrian Netherlands, but today it is a municipality in Belgium, located about 120 kilometres (75 mi) west of Brussels.

In the Flanders Campaign of 1794, the Coalition army made its main drive against the French center while the French attacked on the two flanks. The Coalition was successful at first but the French soon seized the initiative with persistent attacks. When the Coalition forces shifted east to defend the line of the Sambre River at the end of May, the left wing of Pichegru's Army of the North laid siege to Ypres. Clerfayt's outnumbered corps found itself unable to defend the western flank. A week after Ypres fell, the French won a critical victory on the eastern flank at the Battle of Fleurus.

== Background ==
On France's northeast frontier in March 1794 the Army of the North fielded 126,035 troops or 194,930 if all the garrisons were added. The subordinate Army of the Ardennes numbered only 6,757 soldiers ready for action but 32,773 men when all its garrisons were counted. The combined total was 227,703 men, far too large a number for any one general to manage at that time. Against these, the Coalition fielded 150,000 troops to defend the Austrian Netherlands and the Dutch Republic and 20,000 more to hold Luxembourg. The Coalition plan was to press hard against the French defenses and perhaps open the way to Paris.

General of Division Jean-Charles Pichegru commanded the Army of the North which held the frontier from Dunkirk on the west, through Lille, Douai and Cambrai to Maubeuge on the east. The Army of the Ardennes was posted on its right. The French armies were more numerous but lacked the discipline of the Coalition armies. Lazare Carnot drew up the French strategic plan which was to attack on the two flanks, a "pet theory" of his. Meanwhile, the Coalition armies under Austrian Feldmarschall Prince Josias of Saxe-Coburg-Saalfeld struck in the center with 85,000 soldiers. After repelling two fumbling attempts at relief, Coburg successfully concluded the Siege of Landrecies on 30 April 1794. Meanwhile, Pichegru's forces drove back Feldzeugmeister François Sébastien Charles Joseph de Croix, Count of Clerfayt's corps on the west flank, in the area of Kortrijk (Courtrai) and Menen (Menin) at the end of April and early May. On the east flank, Pichegru simplified his command problems in mid-April by placing three divisions between Cambrai and Maubeuge under General of Division Jacques Ferrand. A few weeks later, the French started attacking the line of the Sambre River, but were beaten on 13 and 24 May. These were the battles of Grandreng and Erquelinnes.

Coburg's main army attacked the Army of the North on 17 and 18 May. Because the attacking columns were poorly coordinated, the French repelled the Coalition army with heavy losses at the Battle of Tourcoing. General of Division Joseph Souham led the French army in Pichegru's absence. Pichegru was bloodily repulsed by Coburg at the Battle of Tournay on 22 May. Relations between Coburg and the British Prince Frederick, Duke of York and Albany became strained and the two could not decide on a common strategy. On the east flank, the French attacked across the Sambre for the third time at the end of May but were forced to pull back in the Battle of Gosselies.

== Operations ==
=== Siege ===
When he placed his right wing divisions under a single leader in mid-April, Pichegru moved his left wing forward. From left to right, the divisions were led by General of Division Pierre Antoine Michaud at the port of Dunkirk with 13,943 men, General of Division Jean Victor Marie Moreau at Cassel with 15,968 troops and Souham at Lille with 31,865 soldiers. The 7,822-strong brigade of General of Brigade Pierre-Jacques Osten held Pont-à-Marcq. In early May, General of Division Jacques Philippe Bonnaud's division arrived from the right wing and absorbed Osten's brigade, making a total of 23,000 men. These were unusually large divisions. In the Army of Sambre-et-Meuse at a later period the divisions numbered between 8,000 and 12,000 men. As late as 1 September 1794, Souham's division counted 20,000 soldiers, Moreau's had 13,000, Bonnaud's numbered 11,800 and General of Division Éloi Laurent Despeaux's had 6,600.

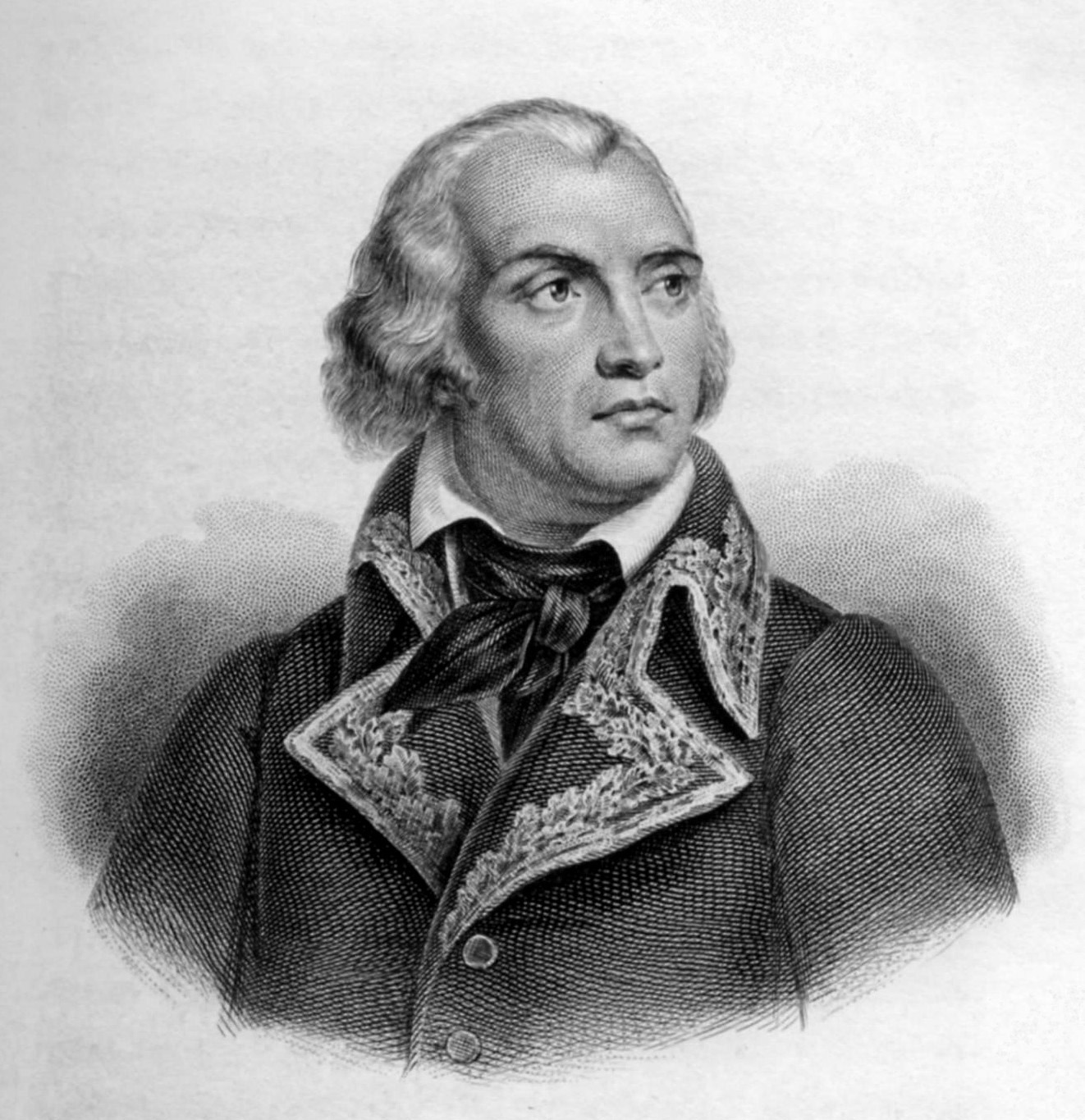
Jean-Charles Pichegru.

Worried about the persistent French attacks along the Sambre, the Coalition high command shifted their weight to the east to cover Charleroi, taking troops from the Duke of York's force at Tournai. Encouraged by his enemies' weakness, Pichegru invested Ypres on 1 June 1794. Moreau's division was employed in the siege operations. Souham covered the siege with Michaud's division on his left and Despeaux's division on his right. Instead of concentrating their forces to crush one of the French wings, the Coalition forces shifted back and forth ineffectively. Meanwhile, the Duke of York was left uselessly guarding Tournai with 30,000 Austrians.

Austrian General-major Paul von Salis commanded the 7,000-man Coalition garrison of Ypres. The Austrian contingent was made up of two battalions of the Stuart Infantry Regiment Nr. 18, the 3rd Battalions of the Schröder Nr. 7 and Callenberg Nr. 54 Infantry Regiments and one company of the O'Donnell Freikorps. The Landgraviate of Hesse-Kassel units consisted of two battalions each of the Erbprinz, Lossberg and Prinz Karl Infantry Regiments, the Leib Squadron of the Gendarmes and 12 field pieces. The Hessians were led by Generals-major Heinrich von Borcke and Georg von Lengerke. Pichegru had about 50,000 troops in the vicinity of Ypres.

Ypres became a cloth trading center in the Middle Ages and was first fortified in the period 1200–1400. The Spanish strengthened the medieval defenses early in the 1600s. The French captured the city but handed it back to Spain in the Treaty of the Pyrenees in 1659. The Walloon engineer Jean Boulengier greatly improved the works in 1669. Nevertheless, in a 1678 siege the city was captured by the French. The military engineer Sébastien Le Prestre de Vauban immediately set about making extensive changes to the defenses that year and later in 1682. The modernizations made Ypres a fortress of the first class. Ironically, Ypres was handed over to the Dutch Republic by the Treaty of Utrecht in 1713, along with Veurne (Furnes), Fort Knokke, Menen, Tournai, Mons, Charleroi, Namur and Ghent. Though the fortresses were in the Austrian Netherlands, they were intended to serve as a barrier to protect Holland. Emperor Joseph II slighted the defenses of Ypres though they were later partly restored.

=== Relief efforts and surrender ===
On 6 June 1794 there was a skirmish at Vry-Bosch (Vrijbos) near Houthulst north of Ypres between 5,500 Coalition troops and an unknown number of French soldiers. General-major Rudolf von Hammerstein led the 3rd and 4th Hanoverian Grenadier Battalions, two battalions of the 14th Hanoverian Infantry Regiment, one squadron of the Hanoverian Leib Cavalry Regiment, the British 12th Foot and 38th Foot, three squadrons of the British 8th Light Dragoons, two battalions of French Royalists, one squadron of Hesse-Kassel Gendarmes and 11 Hanoverian guns. The Coalition lost about 80 casualties, including four killed, 33 wounded and nine captured among the Hanoverians. Aside from 30 men captured, French losses are not known. This was the first unsuccessful attempt to relieve Ypres.

When Clerfayt took a position at Roeselare (Roulers), Pichegru attacked him with three divisions on 10 June. After some fighting the Coalition corps withdrew to Tielt (Thielt). Souham was in tactical control of approximately 20,000 soldiers of whom about 1,000 were killed and wounded in the fighting. In this second attempt to break the siege, the Coalition lost 600 killed and wounded plus 400 captured out of the 20,000 men under Clerfayt. The Austrian troops engaged were two battalions of the Archduke Charles Infantry Regiment Nr. 3, two grenadier battalions, eight squadrons of the Latour Chevau-léger Regiment Nr. 31 and two batteries of foot artillery. Soldiers from the Landgraviate of Hesse-Darmstadt involved in the action were the 1st Battalions of the Leib-Grenadiers and Landgraf Infantry Regiments, two companies each of jägers and light infantry, four squadrons of chevau-légers and one foot artillery battery. Evidently, the Austrians suffered most of the losses because the Hessians reported only one killed and 16 wounded. Roeselare is located about 22 kilometres (14 mi) northeast of Ypres.

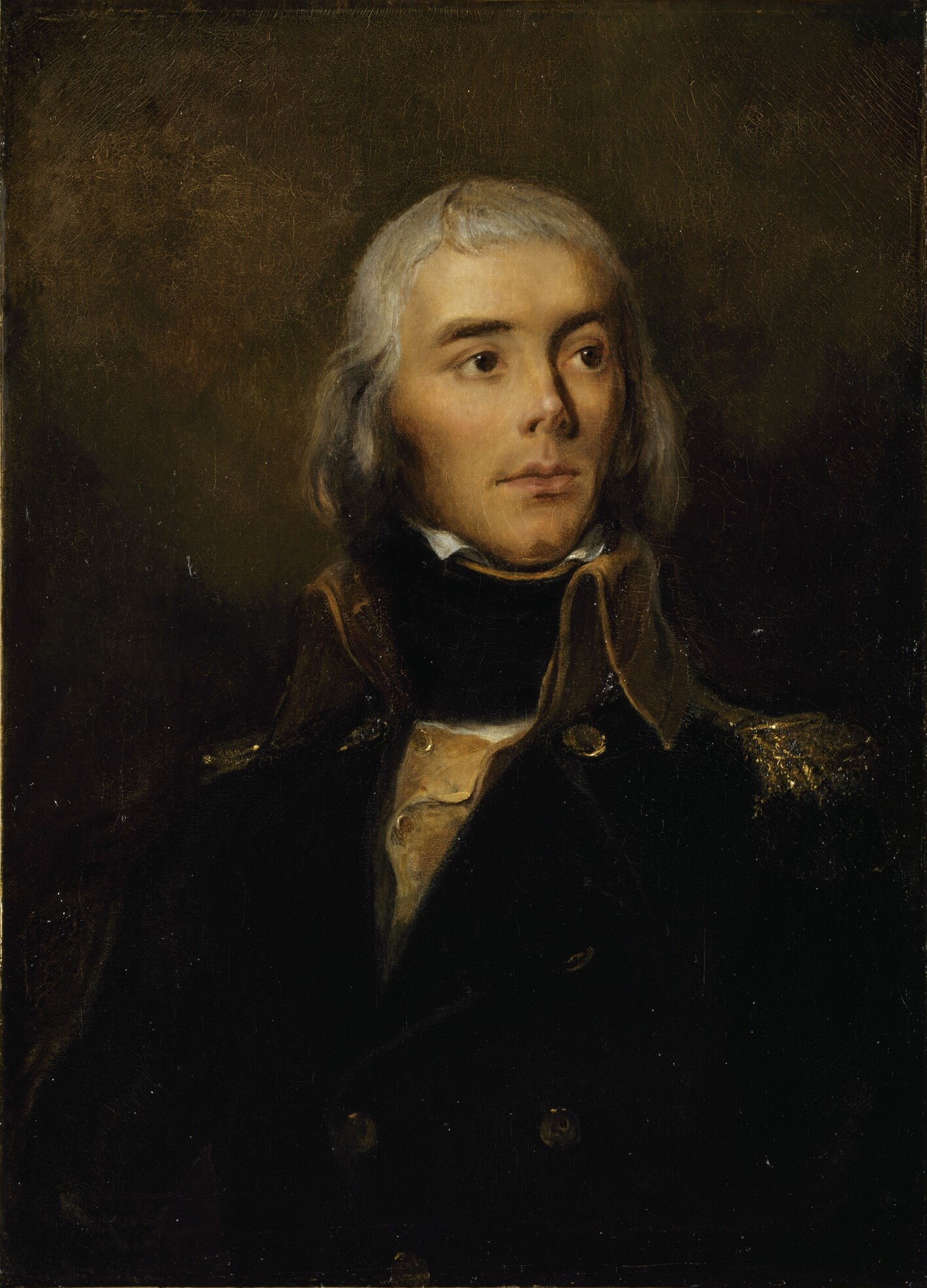
Jacques MacDonald.

At 7:00 AM on 13 June 1794, Clerfayt launched a sudden assault on Despeaux's division. General of Brigade Philippe Joseph Malbrancq's brigade was routed and General of Brigade Jean-Baptiste Salme's brigade was pushed back to the south in the direction of Menen. The weight of the Coalition attack next fell on General of Brigade Jacques MacDonald's brigade at Hooglede, supported by an additional regiment on its left. MacDonald's men held their ground for six hours, fighting off repeated cavalry charges. Finally, General of Brigade (and later Admiral) Jan Willem de Winter's brigade advanced on MacDonald's left and Salme's rallied brigade came forward on his right. At this, the worn-out Coalition soldiers withdrew. Hooglede is 5.1 kilometres (3.2 mi) northwest of Roeselare.

At Hooglede Clerfayt brought 19,000 troops into action of whom 900 became casualties. These included British losses of 28 killed, 70 wounded and 13 missing and Hanoverian losses of 35 killed, 113 wounded and five missing. Feldmarschall-Leutnant Anton Sztáray led the Austrian forces, which included two battalions each of grenadiers, the Archduke Charles Nr. 3, Sztaray Nr. 33 and Wurttemberg Nr. 38 Infantry Regiments, six battalions of reinforcements under General-major Wilhelm Lothar Maria von Kerpen and three foot artillery batteries. General von Hammerstein led the Hanoverian contingent, the 1st, 3rd and 4th Grenadier Battalions, two battalions of the 14th Infantry Regiment, two squadrons of the Leib Cavalry Regiment and two foot artillery batteries. Other engaged troops included the British 38th and 55th Foot Regiments and two squadrons of the 8th Light Dragoons, the French Royalist Loyal Emigrants Battalion and one squadron of Hessen-Kassel Gendarmes. Altogether, the 24,000-strong French force under Souham and MacDonald suffered 1,300 casualties and lost one field piece. Hooglede was the third and final Coalition attempt to lift the siege.

Ypres surrendered on the 17th or 18 June. The surviving members of the garrison marched out with the honors of war and surrendered their weapons, 30 Hessian colors, four Austrian colors and 12 field guns. During the siege 400 defenders were killed. French losses are unknown.

== Results ==
Digby Smith called Ypres the key to the province of Flanders, while Ramsay Weston Phipps remarked that the Austrians never realized the significance of the fortress. Clerfayt immediately retreated to Ghent, chased by Souham's covering force. Part of the victorious Army of the North came into contact with the Duke of York's corps at Oudenaarde on 26 June, but were called away to drive northeast along the coast. Also on the 26th, General of Division Jean Baptiste Jourdan's army defeated Coburg's main army at the Battle of Fleurus. On 1 July, Pichegru's army was at Bruges and by 11 July Pichegru and Jourdan's armies were linked on an east-west line through Mechelen (Malines), Brussels and Namur. The divergent purposes of the Coalition allies now came into the open. The Dutch and British positioned their forces to defend Holland while the Austrians fell back to Louvain and Tienen (Tirlemont) in order to cover Maastricht and their communications with Cologne and Koblenz.
