= Louis Charbonnier =

French army general (1754–1833)

- Born: 9 October 1754; Clamecy, France
- Died: 2 June 1833 (aged 78); Clamecy, Nièvre, France
- Military career
- Allegiance: France
- Branch: Infantry
- Service years: 1780–1815
- Rank: General of Division
- Conflicts: War of the First Coalition; Battle of Jemappes; Battle of Neerwinden; Battle of Grandreng; Battle of Erquelinnes; Battle of Gosselies
- Awards: Légion d'Honneur, 1804; Order of Saint Louis, 1814

Louis Charbonnier (9 October 1754 – 2 June 1833) was a general of mediocre talent who commanded a French army for several months during the French Revolutionary Wars. In 1780 he enlisted in the French Royal Army. With the advent of the French Revolution his promotion became very rapid. In 1792 he was elected second in command of a volunteer battalion. He led his troops at Jemappes and Neerwinden. He was promoted to general of brigade in November 1793 and general of division in January 1794. A week later he was appointed commander-in-chief of the Army of the Ardennes.

In May and June 1794, Charbonnier and Jacques Desjardin jointly led an army that tried three times to establish a foothold on the north bank of the Sambre River. After defeats in the battles of Grandreng, Erquelinnes and Gosselies, Charbonnier was recalled to Paris in semi-disgrace on 8 June 1794. After being unemployed for several months, he was assigned to command a series of garrisons in France and Belgium. He was governor of Maastricht from 1801 to 1814. He was buried in his hometown of Clamecy, Nièvre in 1833. His surname is one of the names inscribed under the Arc de Triomphe, on Column 4.

== Early career ==
On 9 October 1754, Charbonnier was born the son of a shoemaker in Clamecy, a town in what later became the Nièvre departement. As a young man, he enlisted in the Vintimille Regiment as a simple soldier in 1780. The regiment was later renamed the 49th Line Infantry. His fellow soldiers gave him the nickname Fleur d'Orange (Orange Flower). On 18 July 1789 he joined the National Guard of Paris. Later that same year, he emerged as captain in the Clamecy National Guard. Soon appointed captain of a company in the 1st Nièvre Volunteer Battalion, he rose in rank to chef de bataillon (major) by the start of 1792. On 21 September 1792 he was elected second-in-command of the 21st National Volunteers Battalion. While with the Army of the North he fought under Charles François Dumouriez in the battles of Jemappes and Neerwinden. A French order of battle for Jemappes does not list the 21st Battalion. However, the 1st Nièvre Battalion served in the 14th Brigade in the Left Wing under Jean Henri Becays Ferrand. Charbonnier was promoted to general of brigade on 14 November 1793.

== Army commander ==
=== Boussu-lez-Walcourt ===
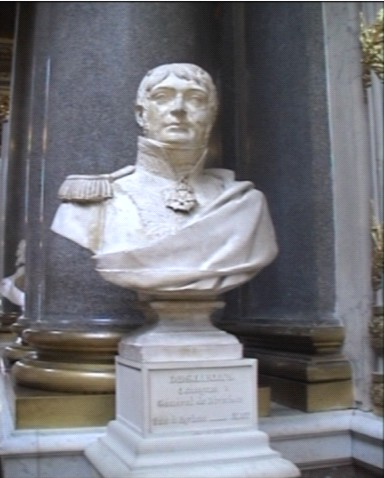
Jacques Desjardin – Charbonnier's colleague

On 28 January 1794 Charbonnier was promoted again to general of division. From the same date he was appointed provisional commander of the Army of the Ardennes. He was named commander-in-chief of the army a week later, on 5 February. His chief of staff was Jean Victor Tharreau. During the winter the army's only activity was sending out foraging parties. The Army of the Ardennes was a subordinate force to the Army of the North and usually took its orders from that army's commander. On 4 April 1794, the army had 8,347 soldiers available for the field and 30,306 men in garrisons. The major garrisons were Givet and Philippeville while over 20 towns held smaller garrisons. The sole field division was led by Philippe Joseph Jacob and his brigadiers were Jean Thomas Guillaume Lorge, Jean Louis Dessaubaz and Jean Baptiste Augier.

Opposite the French army were 27,000 Habsburg Austrian and Dutch soldiers led by Franz Wenzel, Graf von Kaunitz-Rietberg. The Coalition troops were strung out from west to east, with 5,000 near Dinant, 2,000 at Florennes, 2,000 at Boussu-lez-Walcourt, 5,000 at Beaumont, 2,000 at Erquelinnes, 10,000 at Bettignies and garrisons at Namur and Charleroi. At the end of March, the Committee of Public Safety ordered Charbonnier to march on Namur. He received some reinforcements and assembled 15,000 infantry, 2,000 cavalry and 15 position guns near Givet. In early April, the commander of the Army of the North Jean-Charles Pichegru directed Charbonnier to take position west of Philippeville. After a good deal of hesitation, the general finally marched his troops west to the new position on 22 April. After fighting on 26 April his troops ousted the Austrians under Joseph Binder von Degenschild from Boussu-lez-Walcourt. The tactical direction of the clash was left to the leader of the advance guard, Jean Hardy. Degenschild retreated to the Sambre River at Thuin. On the same day, Jacques Desjardin's division of the Army of the North attacked Beaumont which was farther west. On the 27th, Beaumont and Florennes were abandoned and their Coalition garrisons fell back to the Sambre.

=== Grandreng ===
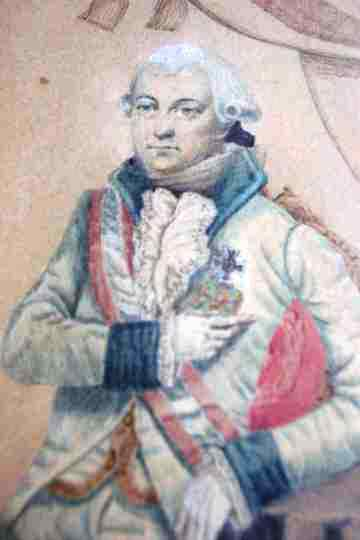
Franz von Kaunitz – Charbonnier's adversary

On 30 April 1794, the Coalition army under Prince Josias of Saxe-Coburg-Saalfeld successfully concluded the Siege of Landrecies. This event nearly split the Army of the North in half. The crisis precipitated a change in French strategy. Pichegru with 70,000 troops of the left wing was directed to capture Ypres and Tournai, while Jacques Ferrand and 24,000 soldiers held the center near Guise and Maubeuge. Desjardin with the right wing of the Army of the North and Charbonnier with the Army of the Ardennes were ordered to mass their 60,000 men near Philippeville. This force was directed to cross the Sambre near Thuin and advance northwest toward Mons. Amazingly, Pichegru neglected to appoint a single leader for the force, relying on the two generals to cooperate.

Charbonnier received his orders on 6 May and immediately held a conference with Desjardin, François Séverin Marceau-Desgraviers and their chiefs of staff where they drew up plans for the offensive. Shortly afterward, Charbonnier wanted to delay in order to get clearer instructions from Pichegru, but Desjardin emphasized that their orders were plain. In preparation, Charbonnier divided his 17,000-man field force into two divisions under Jacob and Marceau plus an independent detachment under Claude Vezú. The two divisions and Hardy's advanced guard were grouped into a corps under Marceau's tactical direction. For his part, Desjardin commanded three divisions, his own and those of Éloi Laurent Despeaux and Jacques Fromentin plus an advanced guard under Guillaume Philibert Duhesme. François Muller took over Desjardin's former division.

The account of the proceedings of Charbonnier and Desjardins sometimes reads like the libretto of a comic opera. –Ramsay Weston Phipps

The French offensive began on 10 May with an advance on the Sambre. On 11 May, troops commanded by Charbonnier were at Lobbes, where they burnt down Lobbes Abbey and its library, resulting in the loss of thousands of valuable manuscripts and books. By the 12th Kaunitz had withdrawn his forces from Merbes-le-Château into an intrenched position between Binche on the left and Grand-Reng on the right. In the Battle of Grandreng on 13 May, Muller and Despeaux assaulted Kaunitz's right flank, Fromentin attacked his center and the garrison of Maubeuge mounted a diversion. Austrian cavalry defeated Fromentin's division, then commanded by Duhesme after its commander was injured. Kaunitz counterattacked and compelled Desjardin to retreat to the south bank of the Sambre. The French suffered the loss of 4,000 men and 12 artillery pieces while Coalition losses numbered 2,800 killed, wounded and captured. During the fighting, the Army of the Ardennes divisions were inactive, leaving Desjardin's 35,000 men to fight Kaunitz's 22,000 Austrian and Dutch troops in a strong position. Screened by a handful of enemies, Jacob's division did not help though it was nearby at Buverinnes. Marceau's division, accompanied by Charbonnier in person, was at Fontaine-l'Évêque baking bread! After Desjardin's withdrawal, Charbonnier's two idle divisions quickly followed suit.

On 6 May two representatives on mission had written a letter to the Committee of Public Safety describing Charbonnier as incompetent and requesting a more experienced commander. It was probably during early May that a balloonist serving with the army overheard a weird conversation between the two commanders. Charbonnier complained that his soldiers were starving in their encampments. He wanted to move across the Sambre in order to get food for his troops. Desjardin agreed but noted that they must organize the operation in the correct military way. Charbonnier replied, "Do you think so? Good, you arrange things militarily; you take charge of that. For me, I'm going to take charge of eating vegetables and pumping oils."

=== Erquelinnes ===
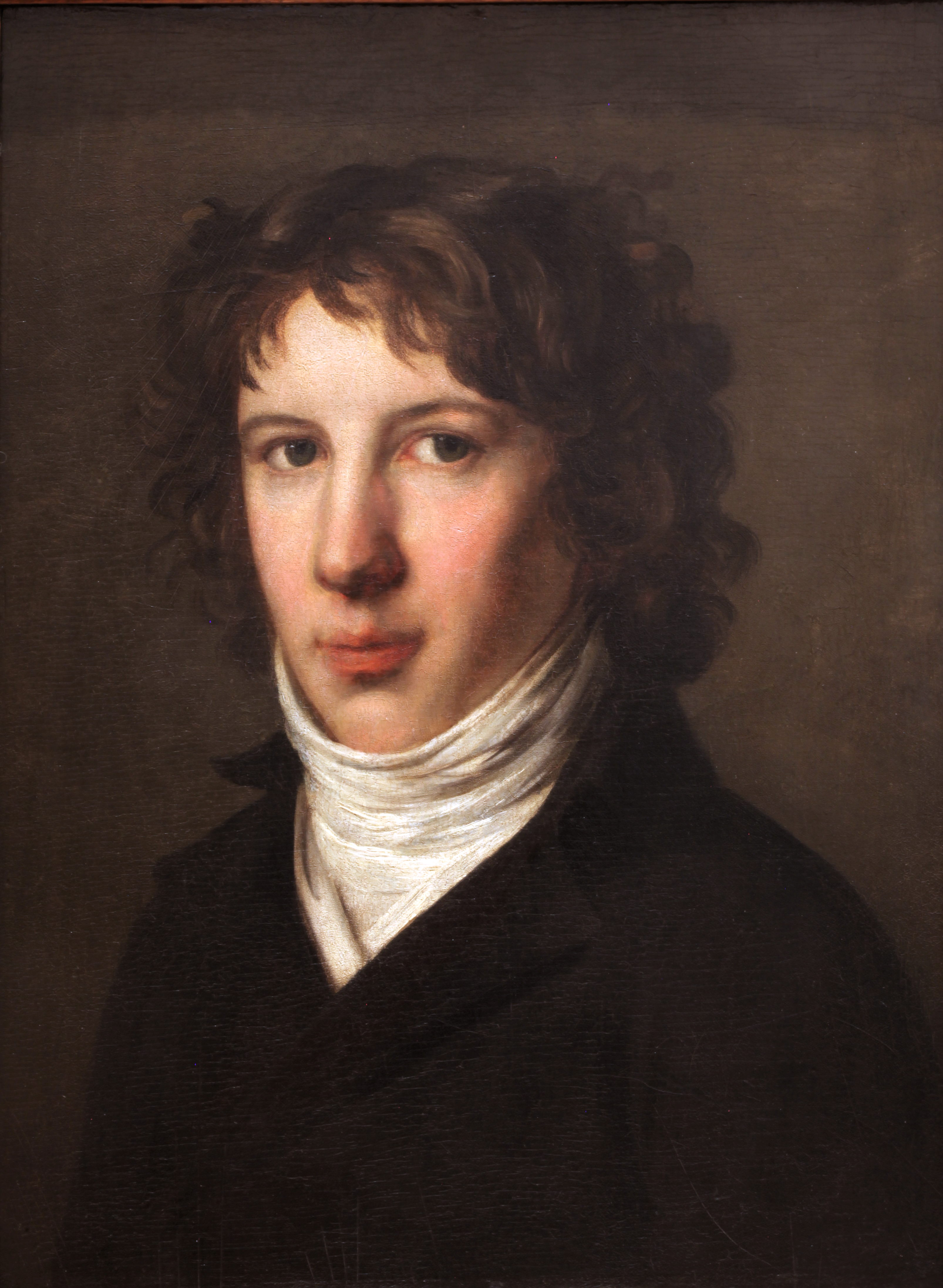
Louis Saint-Just – a dangerous man to oppose

Alarmed by the panic that seized some French units on 13 May, representatives en mission Louis Antoine de Saint-Just and Philippe-Francois-Joseph Le Bas published an order promising death to any soldier who malingered or showed cowardice. In an attempt to unify the command structure Pichegru issued an order that called the Sambre force a single corps. To concert the force's actions, he created a council composed of Charbonnier, Desjardin, Jean Baptiste Kléber and Barthélemy Louis Joseph Schérer. In a reorganization, Jacob was replaced by Jean Adam Mayer, some battalions were exchanged between Mayer's and Marceau's divisions and Lorge was given command of an independent brigade called the Flankers of the Right. Soon after, Marceau became Desjardin's chief of staff and Vezú took over Marceau's division.

I was dismayed. I did not know whom to reproach for operations so badly arranged. I did not see the shadow of treason, but the incapacity of the leaders was flagrant. –René Levasseur

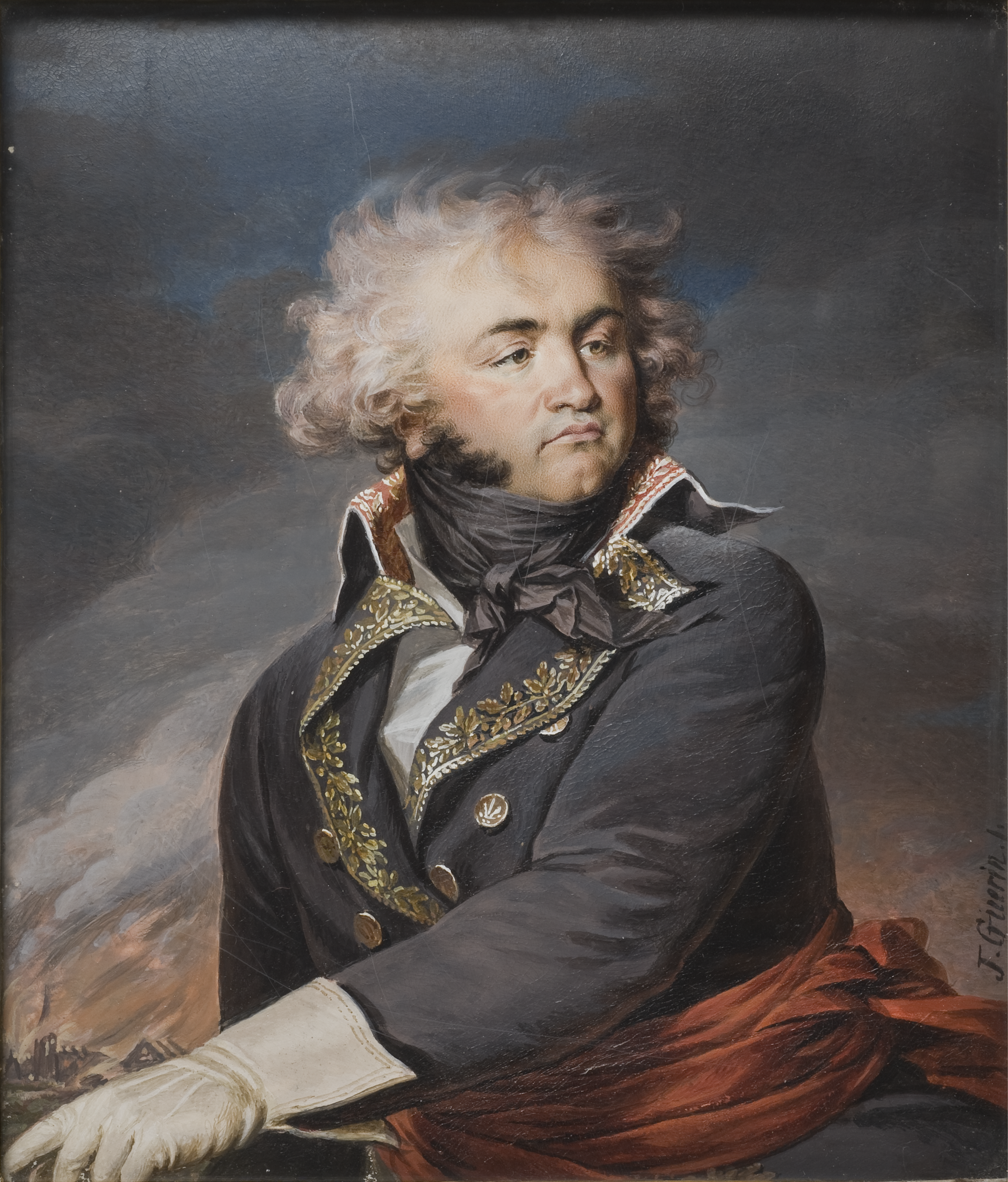
Jean Baptiste Kléber – saved the day

On 20 May, the French crossed to the north bank of the Sambre and took up a position facing west with the left flank resting on Erquelinnes and the right flank at the Bonne-Espérance Abbey. The following day Kaunitz mounted an attack on the new French position. The French were chased out of Erquelinnes but later recaptured the village and stopped the Coalition attack. Kléber suggested using Mayer's unengaged division near Bonne-Espérance to launch a counterattack on Kaunitz's left flank. But since Mayer belonged to the Army of the Ardennes, Desjardin declined to give the general a direct order. The order had to pass through Charbonnier, who was so far away that it was too late to do anything. Vezú's division was at Fontaine-l'Évêque and Charbonnier was preoccupied rounding up cattle and horses. There is evidence from his correspondence that Charbonnier was jealous of his authority as army commander-in-chief and was reluctant to follow Pichegru's instructions. He considered his army as an autonomous force and failed to appreciate that he must cooperate with Desjardin to gain success.

On 22 May, the French troops built fieldworks to fortify their position. A council of war the following day determined to send Kléber with 15,000 men on a raid north toward Nivelles. Despite this decision, Charbonnier gave orders to Vezú and Lorge to move east in the direction of Charleroi. The French generals completely ignored Kaunitz who formed his troops into five attack columns and a Dutch reserve. The assault columns rolled forward at 2:30 AM on 24 May and achieved total surprise in the Battle of Erquelinnes. On the French left, the Austrians quickly overran Erquelinnes and forced the divisions of Anne Charles Basset Montaigu (formerly Despeaux's) and Muller to recross the river to Solre-le-Sambre. Near Péchant (Peissant) Fromentin's division was also routed and fled. Hearing the guns, Kléber turned back from his mission and managed to block the Coalition pursuit long enough for Mayer's division to escape. The French lost 4,000 men, mostly prisoners, and 25 artillery pieces. Another authority estimated that the French lost 3,000 killed and wounded while the Coalition captured 2,400 men, 32 guns and three colors in the debacle. Kaunitz lost only 400 killed and wounded and 250 captured.

=== Gosselies ===
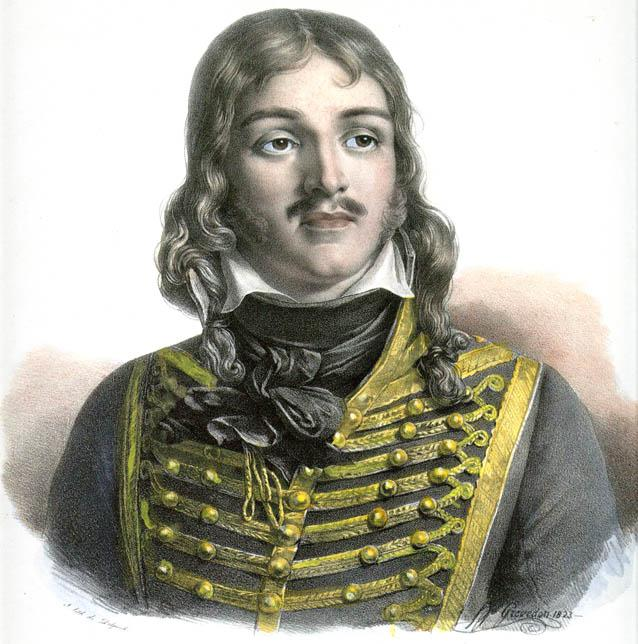
François Marceau – division commander

The next day, the representatives called a council of war at Thuin. The generals hoped for some time to reorganize and supply the soldiers with food and shoes, but during the meeting Saint-Just cut off all further discussion by declaring, "Tomorrow you will make a victory for the Republic: choose between a siege or a battle". Reinforcements from the Army of the Moselle were expected to arrive but Saint-Just was a very dangerous man to oppose. On a visit to the army in Alsace, Saint-Just announced that a general must be executed for the good of the army and Augustin-Joseph Isambert was shot for abandoning a position.

The divisions of Montaigu and Muller were placed under Schérer and ordered to guard the Sambre between Solre-le-Sambre and Aulne Abbey. Marceau was given a newly created division and the staffs of Charbonnier and Desjardin were merged. The forces of Marceau, Vezú, Mayer and Fromentin numbered about 30,000. On 26 May Marceau advanced toward the La Tombe camp south of Charleroi. Fromentin's division was repulsed but other divisions crossed the Sambre again. Marceau's troops went on strike and refused to attack, but the Austrians were unaware of this and evacuated the La Tombe camp that night. Encouraged, the French bombarded and captured Marchienne-au-Pont on the 29th, allowing Marceau and Fromentin to cross the Sambre. On 30 May, Charleroi was completely invested by a ring of French troops and Mayer's division entrusted with the siege operations.

The strangest thing about the force of Desjardins and Charbonnier was the way in which it fought, crossing the Sambre below Maubeuge time after time, but always repulsed by the enemy, and then retreating, sometimes in wild disorder, only to begin again as if it had come fresh out of barracks. –Ramsay Weston Phipps

Meanwhile, Kaunitz was replaced by the Hereditary Prince William of Orange and the Coalition army was reinforced to 35,000 troops on 1 June. Orange planned a concentric attack on the 3rd with one column attacking Fontaine-l'Évêque on the east side, a second Gosselies on the north, a third Ransart on the north-northeast and a fourth Fleurus on the northeast. In the Battle of Gosselies the third and fourth columns brushed aside Vezú's division. Caught between the second and third columns, Fromentin had to retreat quickly. Mayer's division was nearly trapped between the successful Coalition attackers and the garrison of Charleroi, but managed to escape thanks to Marceau who held the bridge at Marchienne-au-Pont. The French lost 2,000 men and one cannon while Coalition losses numbered 444.

Jean-Baptiste Jourdan arrived the next day with 40,000 men of the Army of the Moselle and took command of the entire force, which would soon be called the Army of Sambre-et-Meuse. After the Gosselies defeat, engineer officer Armand Samuel de Marescot wrote to his friend Lazare Carnot on the Committee of Public Safety, explaining that a divided command and bad tactics were the cause of the repeated defeats and that the soldiers were becoming discouraged. He noted that better leaders were wanted. La Bas returned to Paris at this time to report that the current command arrangements were not working. Consequently, the Committee of Public Safety directed Desjardin and Charbonnier to come to Paris The order arrived on 8 June.

== Later career ==
After his recall Charbonnier was not used for a time. Returning to Clamecy in disgrace, he nevertheless remained popular in his hometown. While there, he took a prominent part in the Cult of the Supreme Being festival. Soon after, the Thermidorian Reaction resulted in the execution of Maximilien Robespierre and the fall of his government. At this time, Charbonnier reestablished the Clamecy Société Populaire which had been banned by Joseph Fouché and the radicals. Finally, he received instructions to take charge of the Clamecy National Guard on 7 December 1794. He became military governor of Boulogne-sur-Mer on 12 September 1795. He received temporary appointments to command Givet and Charlemont on 18 February 1796 and Liège on 3 April 1798. He served as military governor of Maastricht starting on 21 April 1801. Among his duties was the supervision of advance posts on the south bank of the Scheldt during the Walcheren Campaign of 1809. He continued in command of Maastricht until May 1814, after Napoleon's abdication.

He died on 2 June 1833. Two authorities asserted that he died at Givet while another source declared that he died in his hometown of Clamecy where he was buried.

== Notes ==
Military offices
Preceded by Michel François de Sistrières	Commander-in-Chief of the Army of the Ardennes; 4 February – 8 June 1794	Succeeded by Jacques Desjardin
