= Grand-Reng =

Coordinates: 50°20′N 4°04′E

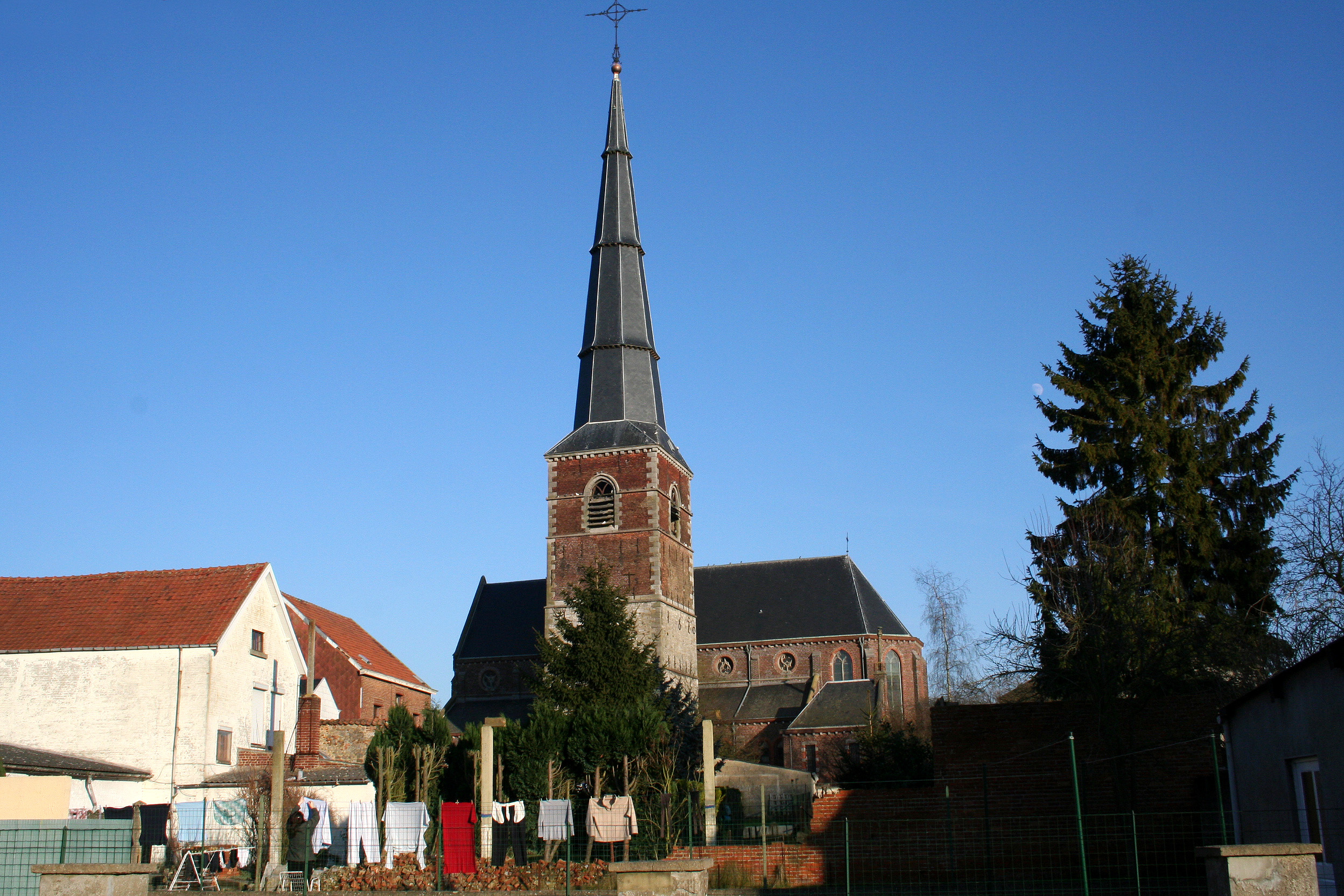
Grand-Reng

Grand-Reng (French pronunciation: [ɡʁɑ̃ ʁɑ̃]; Walloon: Grand-Rin) is a village of Wallonia and a district of the municipality of Erquelinnes, located in the province of Hainaut, Belgium.

It is located on the border with France, on the main road from Mons to Beaumont. Its French neighbour is called Vieux-Reng.

On 13 May 1794, the village was the site of the Battle of Grandreng when Franz Wenzel, Graf von Kaunitz-Rietberg's Austrian army defeated a French army under Louis Charbonnier.
