= Battle of Grand-Reng =

Battle of the War of the First Coalition

Coordinates: 50°20′N 4°4′E

Battle of Grand-reng
- Part of the War of the First Coalition
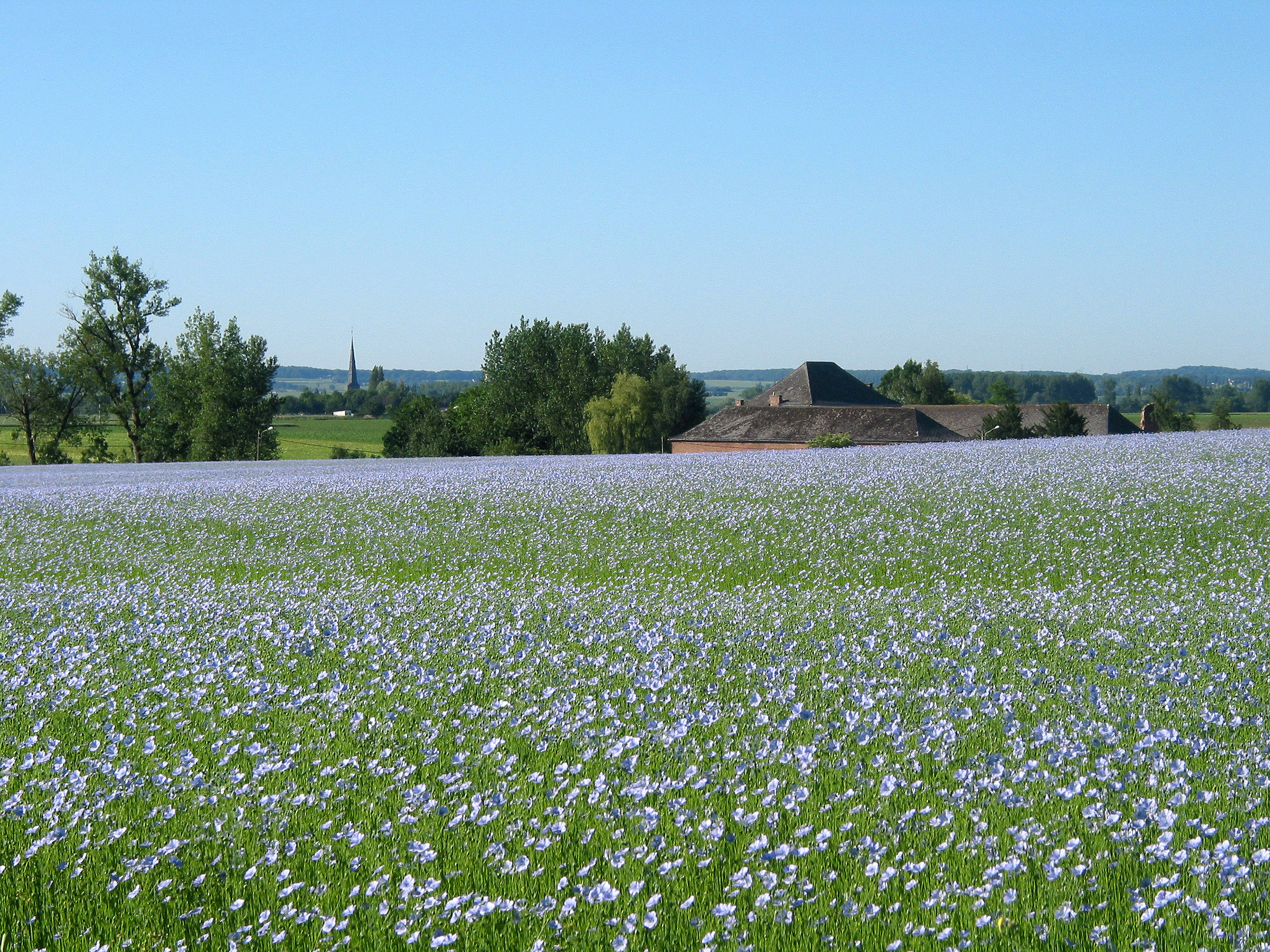
- Flax field in countryside near Grand-Reng in 2007
Date	13 May 1794
Location	Grand-Reng, Belgium
Result	Austro-Dutch victory

Belligerents
(Habsburg monarchy) Habsburg Austria; Dutch Republic	Republican France

Commanders and leaders
(Habsburg monarchy) Graf von Kaunitz	(France) Louis Charbonnier (France) Jacques Desjardin

Strength
27,000	53,000

Casualties and losses
1,400–2,800	3,000–4,000, 12 guns

The Battle of Grand-Reng or Battle of Rouvroi (13 May 1794) saw a Republican French army jointly commanded by Louis Charbonnier and Jacques Desjardin attempt to advance across the Sambre River against a combined Habsburg Austrian and Dutch army under Franz Wenzel, Graf von Kaunitz-Rietberg. After winning crossings over the Sambre at Thuin and Lobbes on the 10th and Merbes-le-Château on the 12th, the French were defeated on 13 May at Grand-Reng and forced to retreat. The War of the First Coalition engagement marked the first of five attempts by the French armies to establish themselves on the north bank of the Sambre. Grand-Reng is now part of the village of Erquelinnes, Belgium, lying close to the border with France. Rouveroy (Rouvroi) is situated 3.8 kilometres (2.4 mi) north. Grand-Reng is located about 33 kilometres (21 mi) southwest of Charleroi.

The spring of 1794 saw intense and continual fighting in the Austrian Netherlands between the French and First Coalition armies. While the Coalition army concentrated their main effort in the center against Landrecies, the French directed their efforts against the flanks. On the eastern flank, the small Army of the Ardennes under Charbonnier joined with three Army of the North divisions led by Desjardin to threaten Mons.

The two French forces failed to cooperate effectively; Desjardin's troops did all the fighting while Charbonnier's soldiers sat idle nearby. After the defeat at Grand-Reng, the French unsuccessfully tried to breach the Coalition defenses at Erquelinnes between 20 and 24 May. The French would make three additional attempts to cross the Sambre at Gosselies on 3 June and Lambusart on 16 June before emerging victorious in the pivotal Battle of Fleurus on 26 June 1794.

== Background ==
=== Strategy ===
After the Coalition success in the Siege of Landrecies in April 1794, French strategy changed. On the left wing of the Army of the North, Jean-Charles Pichegru with 70,000 troops would capture Ypres and Tournai. Meanwhile, Jacques Ferrand with 24,000 men would hold the center of the line near Maubeuge, Avesnes-sur-Helpe and Guise. The right wing of the Army of the North under Jacques Desjardin and the Army of the Ardennes under Louis Charbonnier with a total of 60,000 men were directed to assemble at Philippeville. From that town their combined forces would cross the Sambre River near Thuin and move northwest toward Mons. Pichegru, who commanded the Army of the North, did not assign a single commander to direct the right wing. Historian Ramsey Weston Phipps noted that Pichegru's failure to ensure unity of command was in "defiance of common sense", all the more so because his own success depended on cooperation between the different wings of his army. In fact, Pichegru usually allowed Joseph Souham and Jean Victor Marie Moreau to direct the activities of his left wing.

On 4 May 1794 the Coalition forces were distributed as follows. Prince Frederick, Duke of York and Albany and François Sébastien Charles Joseph de Croix, Count of Clerfayt commanded 30,000 troops of the right wing, spread from Nieuport to Denain. Overall commander Prince Josias of Saxe-Coburg-Saalfeld led the 65,000-strong center with headquarters at Le Cateau-Cambrésis. Franz Wenzel, Graf von Kaunitz-Rietberg directed the 27,000-strong left wing. The extreme left was formed by Johann Peter Beaulieu's 8,000 men at Arlon and Ernst Paul Christian von Blankenstein's 9,000 soldiers at Trier. From his headquarters at Rouveroy, Kaunitz controlled 34 battalions, 20 companies and 39 squadrons. The bulk of the left wing was near Bettignies with a 2,000-man garrison in Charleroi and an observation force of 5,000 men under Karl von Riese watching the crossings of the Sambre and Meuse Rivers.

=== To the Sambre ===
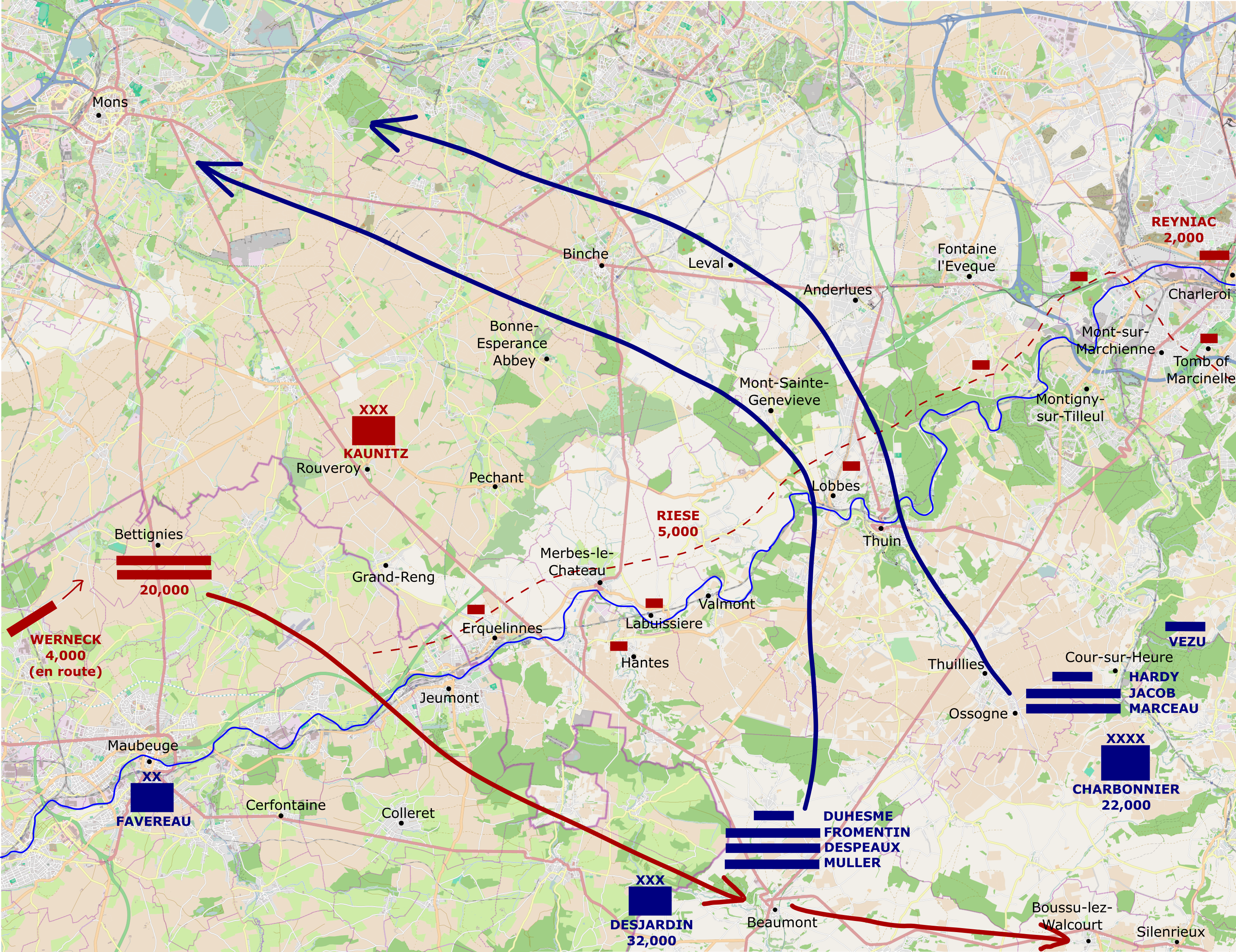
The Allied and French plans of campaign on the Sambre in May 1794. The French had the capture of Mons as their ultimate objective, while the Allies hoped to capture Beaumont and Boussu-lez-Walcourt. The French beat the Allies to the punch by 2 days.

Charbonnier had been appointed army commander on 5 February 1794. When Charbonnier received Pichegru's new instructions on 6 May, he held a conference at Silenrieux with his chief of staff Jean Victor Tharreau, Desjardin and his chief of staff Henri François Marie Charpentier, Jean Baptiste Augier and François Séverin Marceau-Desgraviers. The group planned to start the offensive on 10 May with Desjardin's corps crossing the Sambre to the west of Thuin. Leaving 5,000 troops to guard the Philippeville to Beaumont road, Charbonnier's army was to march via Thuillies and cross the Sambre to the east of Thuin. Once across the river, the Army of the North divisions would move through Mont-Sainte-Geneviève toward Mons. Meanwhile, the Army of Ardennes would march via Leval (Leval-Trahegnies) while posting a flank guard to the east at Fontaine-l'Évêque. Nevertheless, Charbonnier was hesitant about carrying out the plan and Desjardin had to remind his colleague that Pichegru's orders did not leave them any room to back out.

In the Army of Ardennes, Marceau was given tactical control over his own and Philippe Joseph Jacob's divisions. The two divisions would carry out the main thrust led by an advance guard under Jean Hardy. A detachment under Claude Vezú was directed farther east to observe the Le Tombe entrenched camp southwest of Charleroi. The commandant of Maubeuge, Jean Dominique Favereau met with Desjardin on 6 May and the two arranged for Éloi Laurent Despeaux's division to be shifted to a position between Cerfontaine and Colleret. While François Muller's division remained at Maubeuge, Muller himself took command of Desjardin's division. Jacques Fromentin's division marched from Avesnes-sur-Helpe to Jeumont, leaving one brigade under Anne Charles Basset Montaigu at Avesnes. At the end of these movements, three Army of the North divisions under Desjardin were massed between Maubeuge and Beaumont. On 9 May an advance guard of one cavalry regiment, five infantry battalions and a half company of light artillery was formed and assigned to Guillaume Philibert Duhesme.

With everything in readiness, the representatives on mission Louis Antoine de Saint-Just and Philippe-François-Joseph Le Bas decided that Pichegru had been too hasty in ordering the offensive. They wanted to pause several days in order to improve unit organizations and select commanders that had the confidence of the soldiers. In a conference at La Capelle on 9 May, Desjardin convinced the two representatives that the army was ready to attack and that it was too late to cancel the orders. The officials reluctantly gave their assent to the military plan and wrote a letter to the Committee of Public Safety explaining the decision.

== Forces ==
=== French order of battle ===
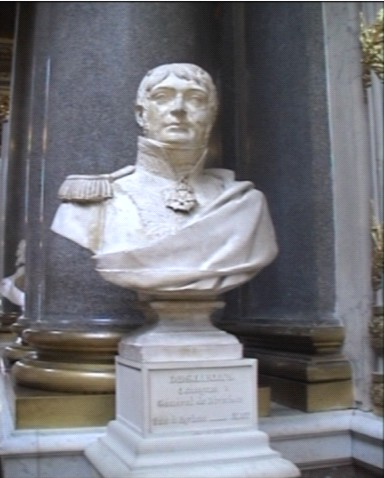
Jacques Desjardin

The 17,000-strong field force of the Army of Ardennes had formerly consisted of Jacob's division and Hardy's advance guard. Charbonnier left Jacob's division intact and expanded the advance guard into a division, assigning it to Marceau. In addition a reserve detachment under Claude Vezú was created. The regular elements of Jacob's division were made up of the 26th Light and 172nd Line Infantry Demi Brigades, 2nd and 10th Hussar and 11th Chasseurs à Cheval Regiments. The volunteers were the 1st Sarthe, 2nd, 3rd and 8th Nord, 2nd Finistère, 2nd National and 8th Pas-de-Calais Battalions.

The regulars in Marceau's division were the 1st Battalion of the 13th Line and the 3rd Battalion of the 9th Light, 16th Light Infantry Battalion, four companies of combined line grenadiers from Vezú's reserve, 5th and 10th Dragoons, 10th Chasseurs à Cheval and three companies of the 23rd Cavalry. The volunteers were the 4th Manche and 9th Seine-et-Oise Battalions. Marceau's second-in-command was Jean-Louis Dessaubaz.

Vezú's detachment was subdivided into three units. Formerly under Dessaubaz, the first unit included the 1st and 2nd Battalions of the 9th Line and the 12th Battalion of Fédérés. Formerly under Jean Thomas Guillaume Lorge, the second unit comprised the 1st Vendée, 4th Aisne and 19th National Volunteer Battalions. The third unit consisted of three companies each of the 23rd Cavalry and 10th Dragoons plus four 8-pound cannons and one 6-inch howitzer.

In a 4 May 1794 return, the 31,736-man force led by Desjardin was organized into three divisions under Generals of Division Muller, Fromentin and Despeaux. Muller's 14,075-strong division was led by brigadiers André Poncet and Joseph Léonard Richard and included the 10th Light Infantry Battalion (753), 1st Battalions of the 18th Line (815), 49th Line (996), 68th Line (744) and 89th Line Infantry Demi Brigades (900), 2nd Battalions of the 68th Line (807), Calvados (960), Haut-Rhin (952), Mayenne-et-Loire (854) and Nièvre (844), 3rd Battalions of the Eure (950) and Haute-Marne (864), 4th Chasseurs Francs (340), 5th Somme (789) and 6th Oise (936) Battalions, 6th Cavalry (138), 7th Dragoon (459) and 16th Chasseurs à Cheval (285) Regiments, 3rd Artillery Regiment detachment (102) and 15th Light Artillery Company (87).

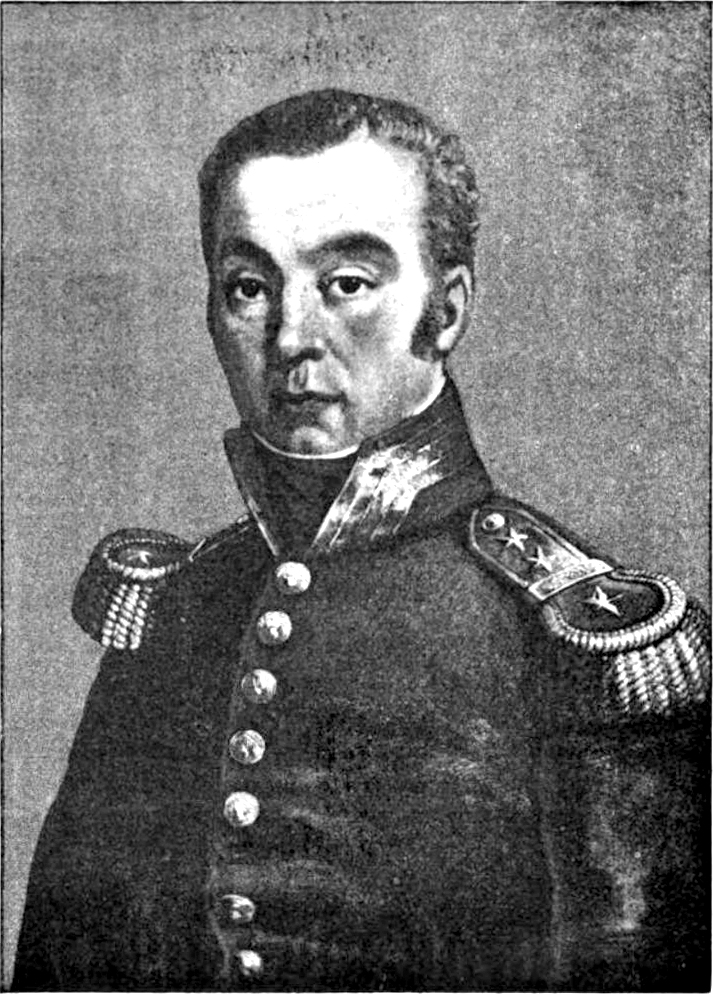
Jacques Fromentin

Fromentin's 10,619-man division was led by brigadiers Duhesme and Guillaume Soland and consisted of the 32nd Light Infantry Battalion (753), 1st Battalions of the 47th Line (870), 56th Line (871), Orne (821) and Saint-Denis (912), 2nd Battalions of the Vienne (926) and Meurthe (806), 5th Vosges Battalion (899), 10th Battalions of the Seine-et-Oise (926) and Paris (892), Gendarmerie (16), 22nd Cavalry (491), 4th Hussar (478) and 12th Chasseurs à Cheval (644) Regiments, 1st Light Artillery Company (91) and an artillery park (98).

Despeaux's 7,042-strong division had Jean-Pierre de Ransonnet as brigadier and was made up of the 1st Battalions of the 17th Line (919), 25th Line (791), Chasseurs de Hainaut (889) and Loiret (783), 3rd Meurthe (865), 4th Nord (816), 6th Pas-de-Calais (875) and 9th Nord (874) Battalions, 1st Squadron of the 6th Cavalry Regiment (127) and detachments from the 3rd (53) and 6th (30) Light Artillery Regiments.

Duhesme's vanguard consisted of the 12th Chasseurs à Cheval, 10th and 32nd Light Infantry, 1st Hainaut Chasseur, 2nd Grenadiers and 5th Vosges Battalions and a half company of light artillery. Montaigu's 4,741-man brigade from Fromentin's division, which was not engaged, comprised the 1st Battalions of the 19th Line (873) and 45th Line (784), 2nd Battalion of the 74th Line (875), 5th Oise (945) and 6th Paris (942) Battalions and 34th Gendarmes (322).

=== Coalition order of battle ===
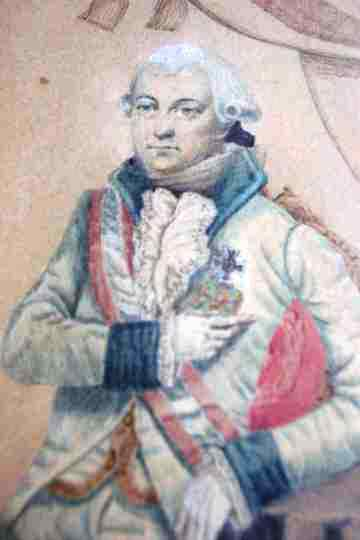
Franz von Kaunitz

On 26 March 1794, Kaunitz disposed of the following forces. From the Dutch Republic there were 18 infantry battalions and 14 cavalry squadrons. The French Royalist troops included two squadrons each of the Bercheny and Saxe Hussar Regiments and four weak companies and four weak squadrons of the Bourbon Legion. The Austrian contingent consisted of Infantry Regiments Klebeck Nr. 14 (two battalions), Hohenlohe Nr. 17 (two battalions), Gemmingen Nr. 21 (two battalions), Ligne Nr. 30 (one battalion), De Vins Nr. 37 (one battalion), Jellacic Nr. 53 (one battalion), Vierset Nr. 58 (three battalions) and Salzburg (one battalion), three grenadier battalions, Carneville Freikorps (three companies), Mahony Freikorps (10 companies), Slavonic Freikorps (two companies), Kaiser Chevau-légers Nr. 1 (two squadrons), Barco Hussars Nr. 35 (eight squadrons) and Nassau Nr. 14 Cuirassiers (six squadrons). Subordinate generals were Riese, Johann Gottfried Schröder, Adam Bajalics von Bajahaza, Prince Heinrich XV of Reuss-Plauen, Paul Davidovich, Franz Vincenz von Hoditz and Joseph Binder von Degenschild.

Another source listed Kaunitz's forces at Grand-Reng as Infantry Regiments Beaulieu Nr. 31 (one battalion), Esterhazy Nr. 34 (two battalions) and Ulrich Kinsky Nr. 36 (two battalions) plus the Barco and Nassau Regiments listed above.

== Battle ==
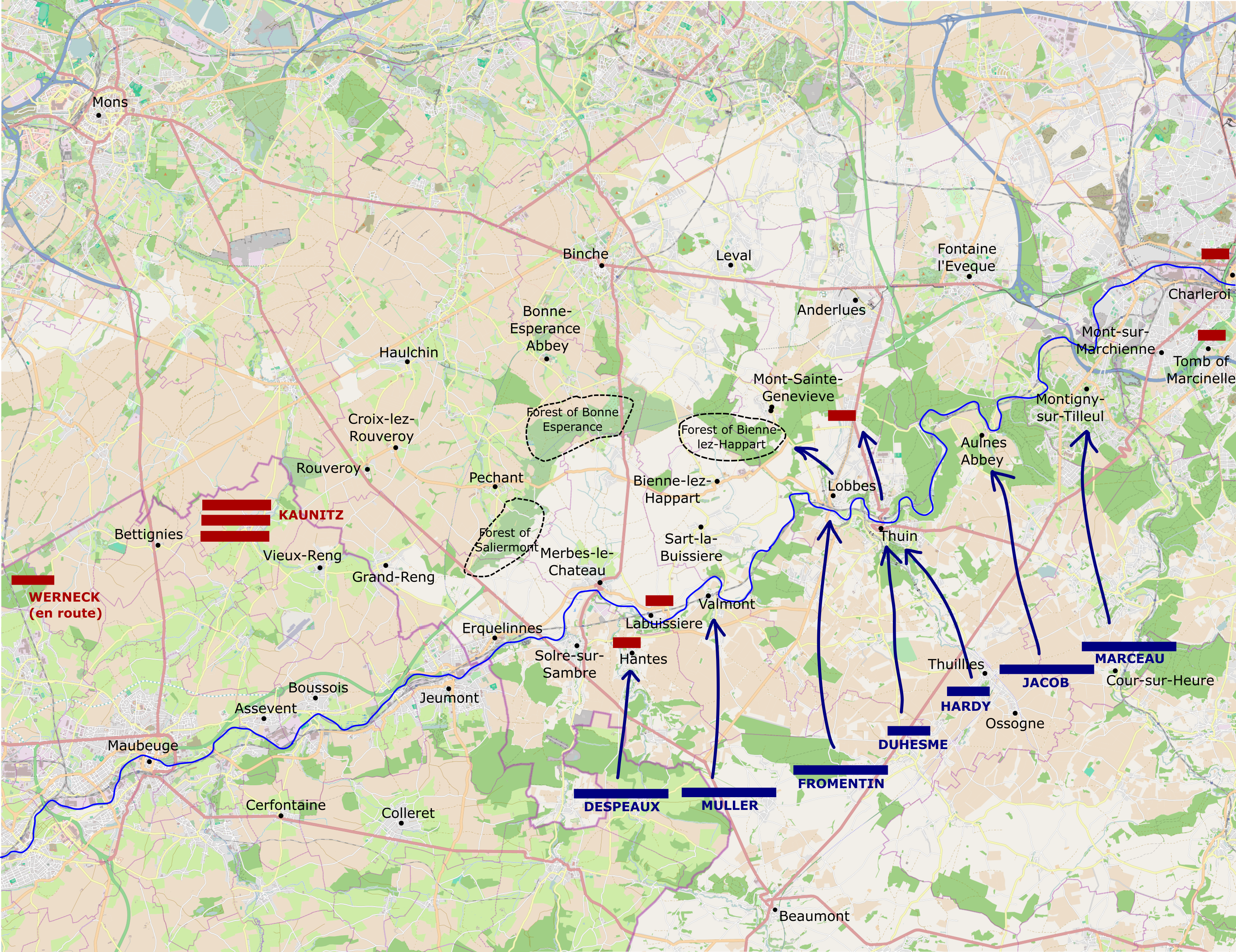
Movements on 10 May 1794. The French begin crossing the Sambre, establishing a bridgehead with Fromentin and the vanguards at Lobbes and Thuin, while Despeaux and Muller are halted at the defended crossings upstream of Fromentin.

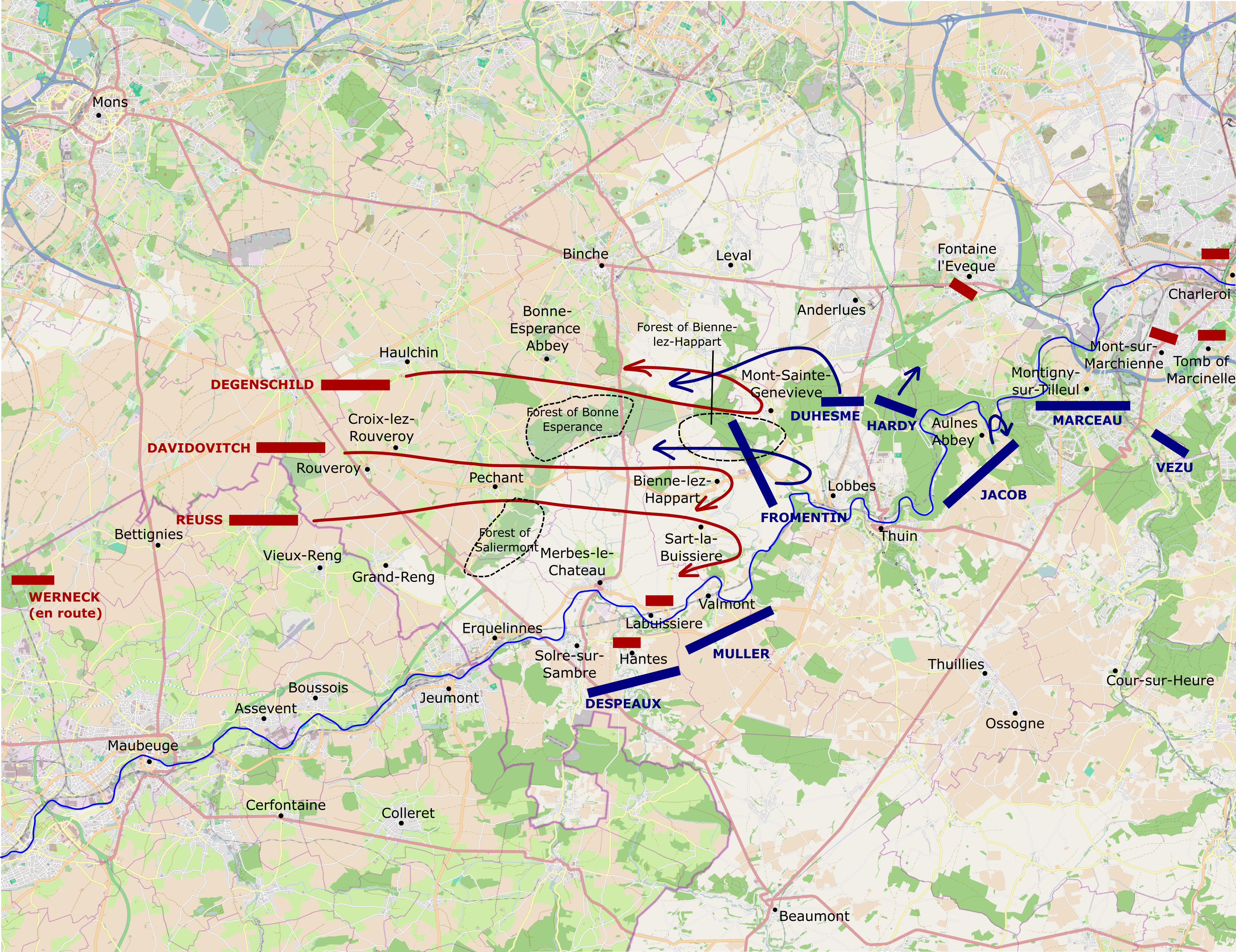
Movements on 11 May 1794. Kaunitz launches an attack with his main force on Fromentin's division and almost forces it back across the river, but he fights it off with the timely assistance of Duhesme's vanguard. Kaunitz then withdraws towards Rouveroy in the evening as it becomes clear he is greatly outnumbered.

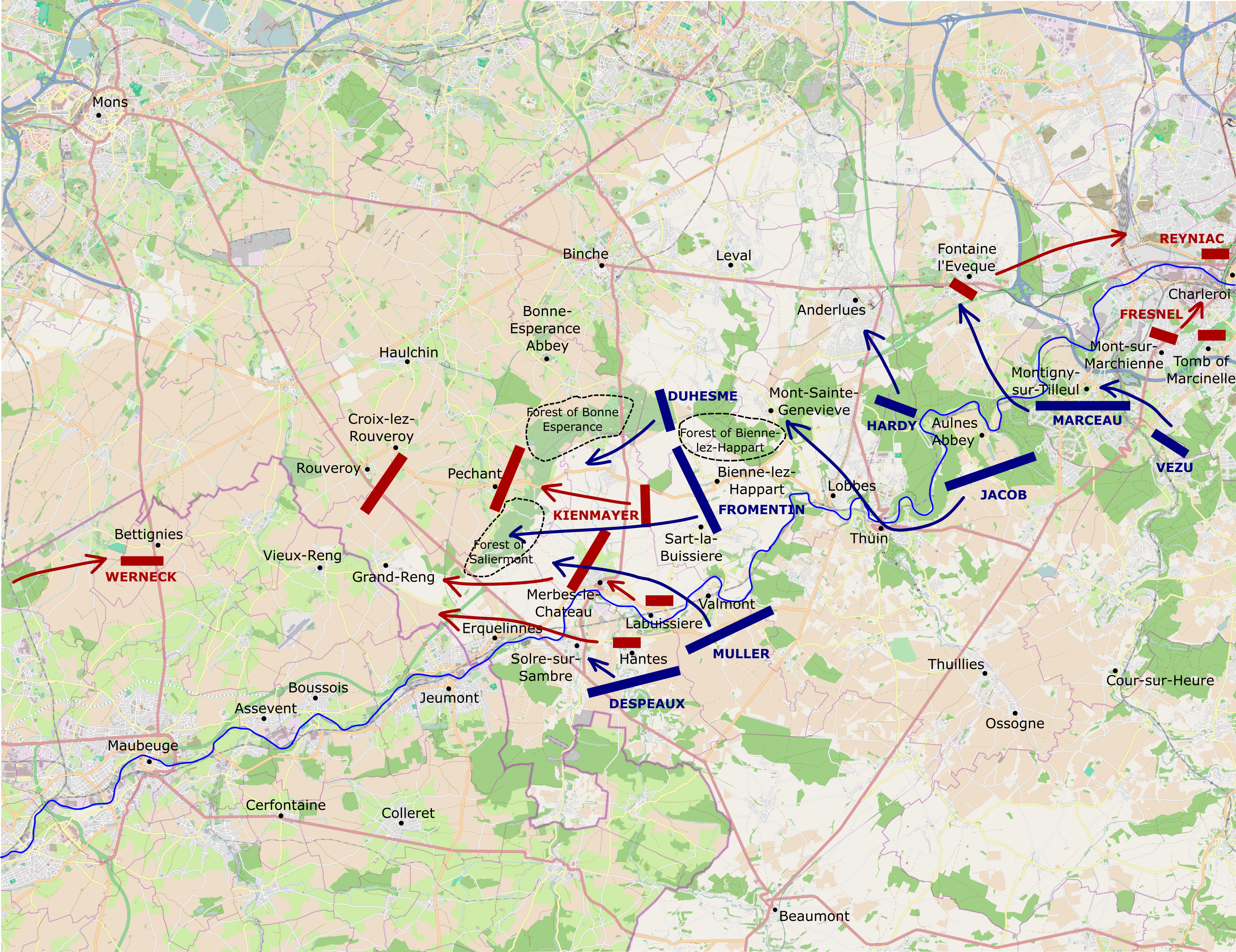
Movements on 12 May 1794. Fromentin and Duhesme push the Allied rearguard back, forcing the Coalition forces defending the Sambre crossings to retreat and allowing Muller and Despeaux to cross the Sambre. Together, they storm Merbes-le-Chateau. Kaunitz pulls his forces back for a stand near Rouveroy. Meanwhile Charbonnier, completely uninterested in Desjardin's struggle to the west, pursues his pet project (in the opposite direction) of cutting off and capturing Charleroi instead.

=== 10 to 12 May: Skirmishing ===
Kaunitz wanted to carry out the orders of Emperor Francis to seize Beaumont and Boussu-lez-Walcourt, but he believed that he was facing 30,000 Frenchmen. In response to the Austrian general's request for reinforcements, Coburg sent him six battalions and eight squadrons led by Franz von Werneck plus 10 artillery pieces. With this addition of strength, Kaunitz planned to launch an attack on 12 May. In the coming operations, the Coalition would be outnumbered 53,000 to 24,000.

On the evening of 9 May the French marched to their assembly areas in heavy rain. The Army of the North divisions camped near Beaumont while Marceau's two divisions bivouacked to the northeast between Ossogne and Cour-sur-Heure. Vezú was at Pry near Walcourt. Early the next morning the French moved north in seven columns on a front of 20 kilometres (12 mi). From left to right, these were Despeaux moving on Hantes (Hantes-Wihéries), Muller on Valmont (Fontaine-Valmont), Fromentin on Lobbes, Duhesme and Hardy converging on Thuin, Jacob on Aulne Abbey and Dessaubaz (leading Marceau's division) on Montigny-le-Tilleul. On the 10th, the French closed up to the Sambre. After some brisk clashes, footholds were seized on the north bank by Duhesme's and Hardy's columns at Thuin and by Fromentin's division at Lobbes.

In the evening the Coalition still held the entrenched camps of Hantes, Labuissière and La Tombe Marcinelle. The next day, Charbonnier and Desjardin held a council of war near Montigny-le-Tilleul. This is the probable occasion of a bizarre conversation between the two generals. The balloonist and chemist Joseph de Montfort overheard Charbonnier complain that his soldiers were starving in their camps. He wished to cross the Sambre in order to feed his troops. Desjardin agreed but pointed out that it would be a good idea to organize the crossings in proper military fashion. Charbonnier responded as follows.

Do you think so? Good, you arrange things militarily; you take charge of that. For me, I'm going to take charge of eating vegetables and pumping oils. –Louis Charbonnier

The embarrassed balloonist slipped out of the room. On 6 May, two representatives on mission had written to the government that Charbonnier was incompetent and asked that he be replaced by a more experienced officer.

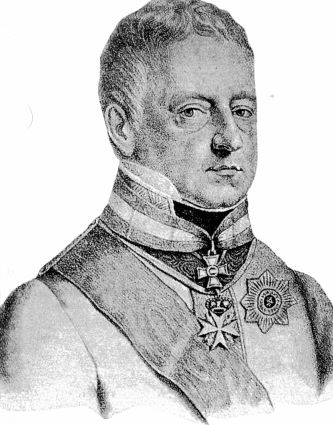
Michael von Kienmayer

Kaunitz cancelled his 12 May attack plan and sent three columns to hold the line of the Sambre. Three Austrian and two Dutch battalions and the Lobkowitz Chevau-légers Nr. 28 under Degenschild were sent toward Lobbes. Davidovich was sent along the southern edge of the Bienne-lez-Hapart Wood while Prince Reuss was directed to the Sambre near Sars-la-Buissière. Franz von Reyniac covered Fontaine-l'Évêque with two battalions and one squadron, while Jean Charles Pierre Hennequin de Fresnel held Mont-sur-Marchienne near Charleroi.

At noon on 11 May, the Austrians attacked Fromentin's leading formations in the Bienne-lez-Hapart Wood, where the main fighting took place during the day. At first, Fromentin's men were forced back almost to the bridge at Lobbes. Duhesme's advance guard, which was advancing north on the Thuin to Anderlues road, turned back when the sounds of battle were heard to its rear. Together, Duhesme and Fromentin cleared the Coalition forces out of the woods after an all-day struggle in a persistent rain that caused many muskets to misfire. Farther to the east Jacob's attack failed. Kaunitz found from prisoners that he was facing 45,000 Frenchmen and elected to withdraw to the heights of Rouveroy. Michael von Kienmayer was detailed to cover the retreat with seven squadrons of the Barco Hussars Nr. 35 and three battalions of grenadiers.

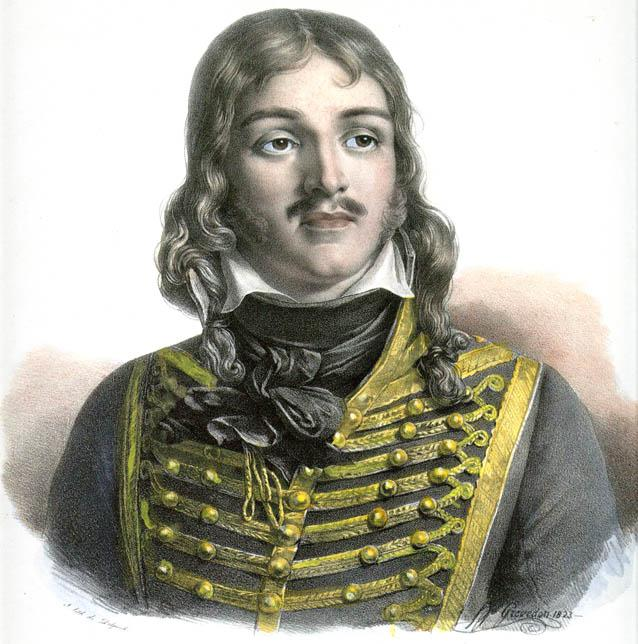
François Marceau

That night French supply convoys caught up and each soldier received two rations of bread and 60 cartridges. Desjardin issued orders for a renewed advance at noon on 12 May. Marceau was to march to Fontaine-l'Évêque while Jacob moved to Mont-Sainte-Geneviève. The columns of Duhesme, Fromentin and Muller were directed to converge on Merbes-le-Château while Despeaux would seize Hantes. On the extreme right, Vezú took position at Montigny-le-Tilleul. Kaunitz massed his forces in three main bodies at Merbes-le-Château, Rouveroy and Péchant (Peissant) while directing Kienmayer to slow the French advance. Faced by as many as 15,000 troops on the eastern flank, Reyniac and Fresnel determined to fall back on Charleroi while delaying their enemies as much as possible.

Charbonnier and representative René Levasseur accompanied Dessaubaz's brigade. This unit occupied Fontaine-l'Évêque without much trouble and began to forage for food. Jacob halted at Mont-Sainte-Geneviève. After some skirmishing, Duhesme and Fromentin pressed back Kienmayer to the west and uncovered the river crossings in front of Muller's division. Under fire, some grenadiers of Muller's 49th Line Infantry swam the Sambre and secured a foothold. Using captured supply barges, Poncet's brigade built a bridge at Labuissière while Richard's brigade crossed at Valmont. With their left flank turned, the Austrians abandoned the camp at Hantes. In the evening the French overran the Merbes-le-Château camp with a bayonet charge. Kienmayer's losses were 150 killed and wounded plus 100 men, one cannon and seven caissons captured. French losses were 1,400 killed, wounded or prisoners and three cannons dismounted. That evening, Despeaux was at Solre-le-Sambre, Muller at Labuissière, Fromentin at the western edge of the Saliermont Woods and Duhesme near the Bonne-Espérance Abbey Woods.

=== 13 May: Battle ===
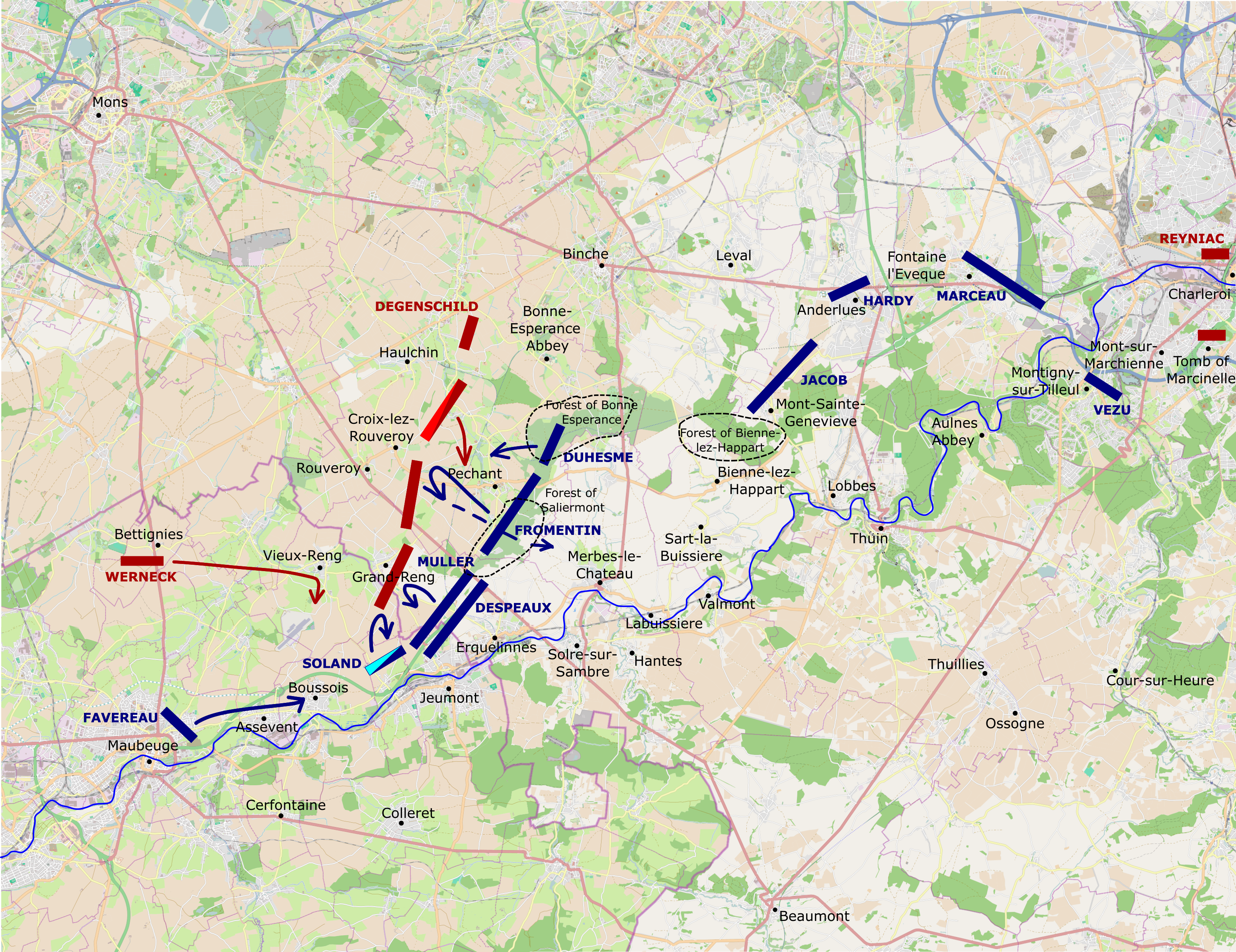
The battle of Grand-Reng, morning, 13 May 1794. French frontal attacks against the prepared Allied defences of Grand-Reng and Croix-lez-Rouveroy fail. Austrian cavalry cuts up Fromentin's division and forces it to retreat, covered by Duhesme's vanguard. Meanwhile Charbonnier's divisions sit idle, far from the battle.

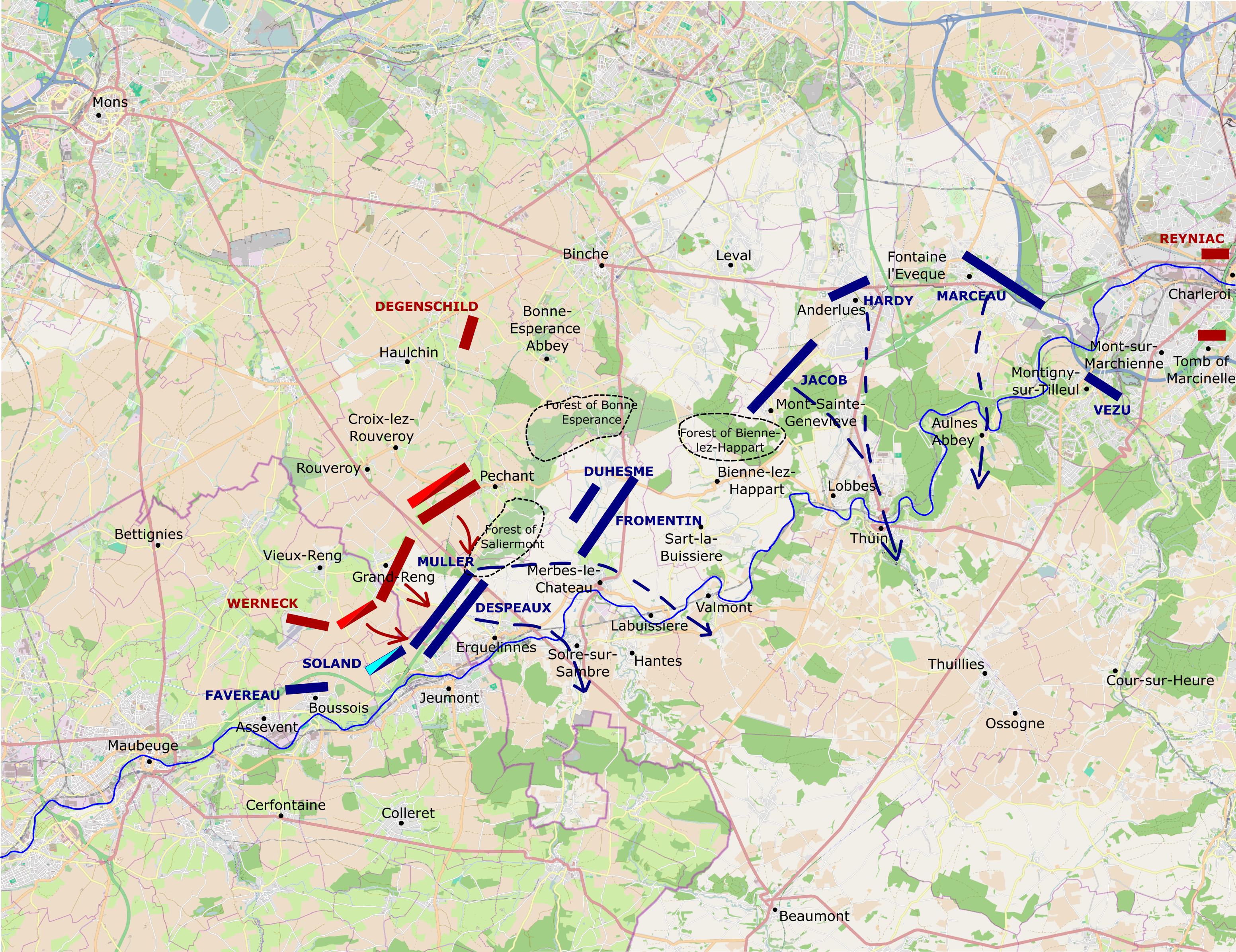
The battle of Grand-Reng, afternoon, 13 May 1794. Fighting around Grand-Reng has been stalemated, but Fromentin's and Duhesme's withdrawal exposes Muller's and Despeaux's right flanks. Putting together a cavalry reserve under Kienmayer, Kaunitz launches a final attack on both flanks of the exhausted French, forcing Desjardin to call a withdrawal. Fromentin and Duhesme remain on the north bank overnight to cover the withdrawal of artillery.

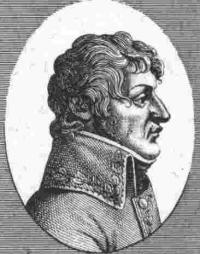
Guillaume Duhesme

That night Desjardin received intelligence that his enemies were being reinforced by 25,000 foot and 5,000 horse, yet he still planned to attack the next day. In fact, the information was wrong and the worried general commanded an army twice the size of his opponents. In the Grand-Reng-Rouveroy position, Kaunitz had only 17,823 Austrians and 4,530 Dutch troops, or a total of 22,353 including 4,357 cavalry. To replace Werneck's division at Bettignies, Prince Coburg reluctantly sent Maximilian Anton Karl, Count Baillet de Latour with six battalions and eight squadrons.

Desjardin planned to send the left divisions under Muller and Despeaux against Grand-Reng, the center division under Fromentin against Rouveroy and Duhesme's advance guard against Péchant on the right. Drawing from all his divisions, Desjardin formed a four-regiment cavalry division including a battery of light artillery and placed it under Soland. Jacob's division was posted at Mont-Sainte-Geneviève and Buvrinnes while Marceau's was baking bread at Fontaine-l'Évêque with Charbonnier and Levasseur. Charbonnier hoped to march on Charleroi within a day if his colleague Desjardin was victorious. From Maubeuge Favereau would mount a diversionary attack on Assevent by a 1,200-man column.

The French moved out at 5:00 AM and occupied lightly held Péchant before continuing toward Croix-lez-Rouveroy. Muller's division advanced toward Grand-Reng with Despeaux following in a second line. Soland's cavalry covered the left flank of the battle line. Kaunitz massed the bulk of his troops on a ridge 800 metres (875 yd) southwest of Rouveroy with a battalion of the Ulrich Kinsky Regiment Nr. 36 on the right flank at Grand-Reng. The better part of the numerically and qualitatively superior Austrian cavalry was posted to the northeast between Croix-lez-Rouveroy and Haulchin. Degenschild held the left flank near Binche with four battalions and the Lobkowitz Chevau-légers.

On the French left, the divisions of Muller and Despeaux carried some outer defenses east of Grand-Reng, but were unable to capture the village itself. Supported by Soland's cavalry, they attacked three times, making use of heavy skirmish lines, but each time they were repulsed with heavy losses by Coalition artillery fire. Due to the bad condition of the roads, the heavier French cannons were unable to get forward quickly enough to suppress the enemy bombardment. Commanding the right brigade, Poncet particularly distinguished himself during the attacks.

In the center, Fromentin's horse was killed and he was so badly bruised that he turned over his division to Duhesme. The Austrian cavalry attacked near Péchant and cut the 10th Light Infantry to ribbons. The attack on Croix-lez-Rouveroy was repulsed and Fromentin's lines began to crumble in the face of enemy cavalry attacks. Using his best troops, Duhesme covered the withdrawal and prevented a rout. Duhesme's and some of Fromentin's men retreated to the same place that they camped the night before. Michel Ney with a squadron of French hussars struck back and captured a number of Coalition troops.

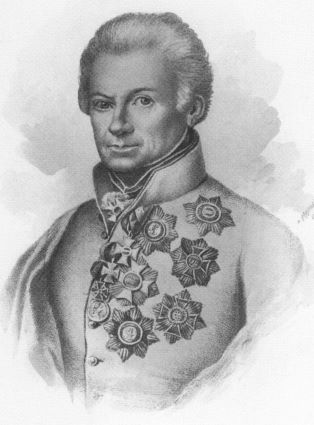
Prince Reuss

With Fromentin's troops falling back, the Coalition forces tried to exploit the resulting gap by attacking Muller's exposed right flank. Desjardin committed Soland's cavalry to the fray, but after a successful charge, the horsemen were compelled to rally behind Poncet's brigade. Muller and Despeaux's troops were able to break into Grand-Reng. A sudden charge by Austrian cavalry broke Poncet's 2nd Calvados Battalion but the 49th Line and 2nd Maine-et-Loire held firm. Meanwhile, Werneck's division arrived near the battlefield but was held at Vieux-Reng to observe Favereau's 1,200 men at Boussois.

By this time it was 5:00 PM and Kaunitz wanted to win the battle before nightfall. Accordingly, he formed a cavalry force under Kienmayer consisting of the Bourbon Legion, one squadron each of the Kinsky Chevau-légers Nr. 7 and Nassau Cuirassiers Nr. 14 and four squadrons of the Barco Hussars Nr. 35. After an intense artillery bombardment, Kaunitz hurled the horsemen at the French left wing. Having shot away most of their ammunition, the tired and hungry French soldiers began to give way in disorder and Desjardin issued orders to retreat. Probably the onset of darkness prevented a complete rout.

== Result ==
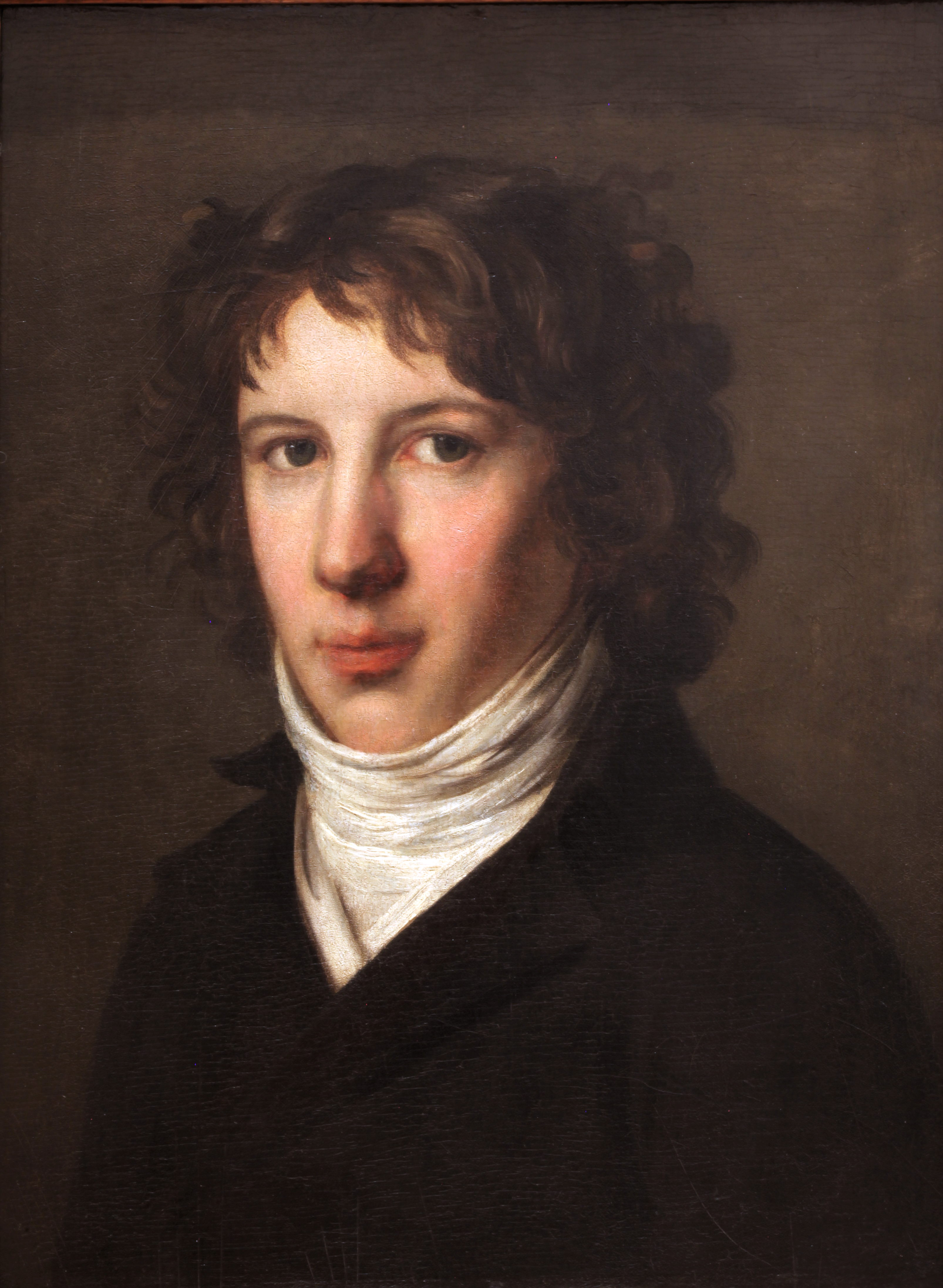
Louis Saint-Just

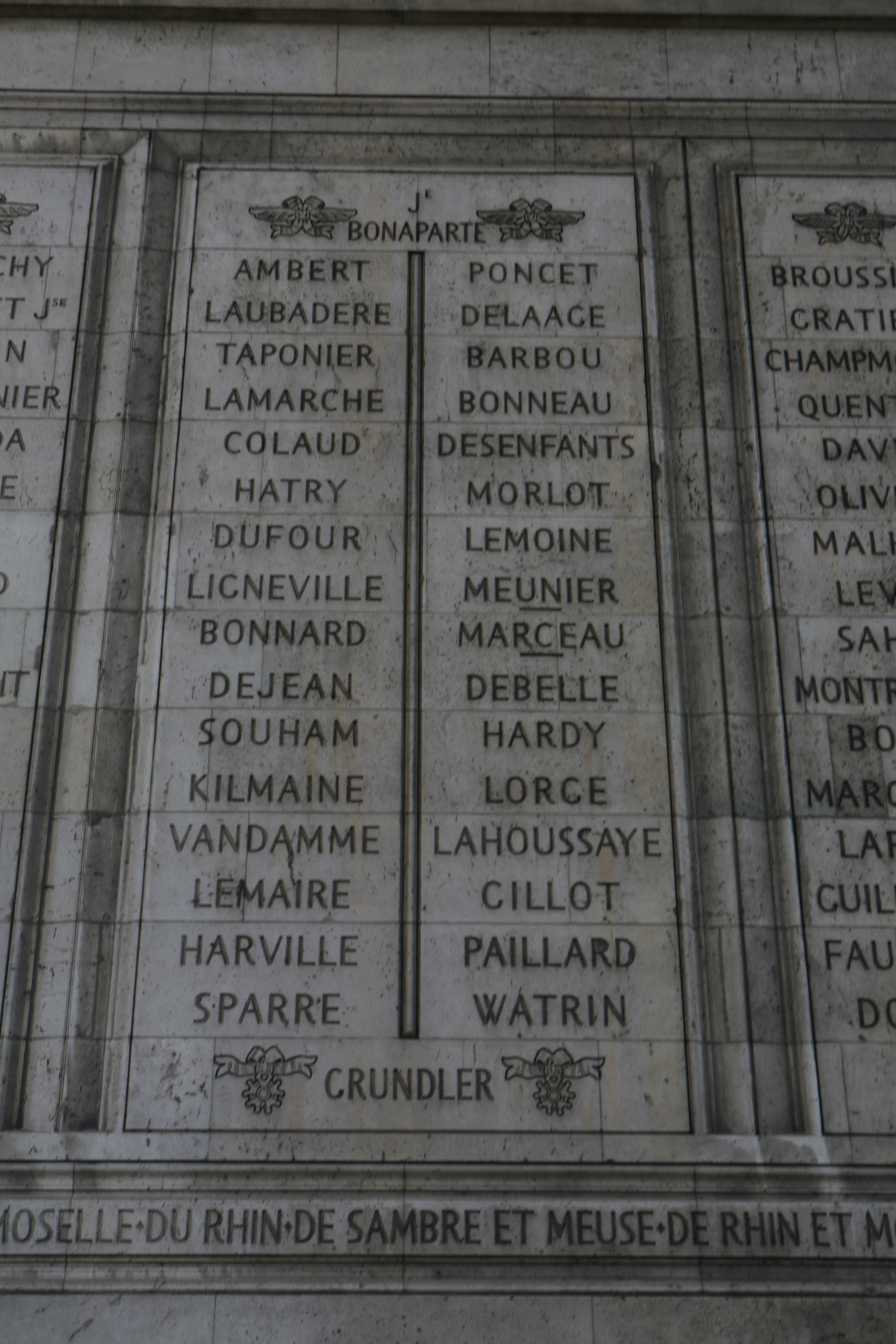
The names of Poncet, Marceau, Hardy and Lorge are on Column 6 of the Arc de Triomphe.

Despeaux's men retreated by the Solre-le-Sambre bridge, Muller's men by the Labuissière and Valmont bridges and some of Fromentin's men by the Lobbes bridge. Duhesme's and the rest of Fromentin's soldiers remained on the north bank until the morning of 14 May, allowing most of the French artillery to escape. Jacob's troops recrossed the Sambre at Thuin and Marceau's at Aulne Abbey. By the evening of 14 May, the French lined the southern bank of the river from Marpent on the west to Landelies (near Montigny-le-Tilleul) on the east.

The French suffered 4,000 casualties and lost 12 guns. Coalition losses amounted to 2,800 killed, wounded and missing. In the combats between 10 and 13 May, Desjardin admitted 3,000 French losses while Kaunitz reported 1,400 losses. Two more casualties were the destruction of Lobbes and Aulne Abbeys. These institutions were ordered to be burned by Saint-Just on the afternoon of the 14th in order to deny the enemy the food that was stored in the buildings. Ironically, both places remained under French control. The abbot of Aulne later described Saint-Just as a "monster with a human face".

Historian Victor Dupuis attributed the French defeat to the inactivity of the Army of the Ardennes and to Desjardin's mistaken belief that he was outnumbered when he actually had a superiority of 35,000 to 22,000 men over Kaunitz. While Charbonnier was busy baking bread, Desjardin's shoeless and badly-clothed men, lacking heavy artillery and with damp gunpowder were making a frontal attack on a well-organized defensive position covered by the repeated charges of the Austrian cavalry. Duhesme wrote that Jacob's division might have been used to turn the Coalition flank but instead it remained inert.

We were all in our infancy in the military art. –Guillaume Duhesme

Kaunitz tried to exploit his victory by an advance at mid-morning on 15 May. Three columns tried to force their way across the Sambre at Thuin, Lobbes and Labuissière. At the latter place there was a three-hour artillery duel starting at 11:00 AM between Muller's guns and the Coalition artillery. From cover, the French infantry laid down such an effective fire that the opposing foot soldiers were unable to gain a foothold on the south bank. The 68th Line and the 3rd Haute-Marne especially distinguished themselves. Since the long-awaited pontoons never arrived, Kaunitz called off his attack and gave up his plan to reoccupy the Hantes camp. The Coalition corps withdrew into defensive positions. During the affair, five Austrian artillery pieces were dismounted against four French guns put out of action.

== See also ==
- Nafziger, George. "French Corps of Desjardin, 9 May 1794, Forces at Maubeuge Destined to Advance on Mons" (PDF). United States Army Combined Arms Center. Archived from the original (PDF) on March 10, 2014.
- Rickard, J. (2009). "Sieges of Charleroi, 30 May-25 June 1794". historyofwar.org.
