= Jean-François Brémond =

French painter

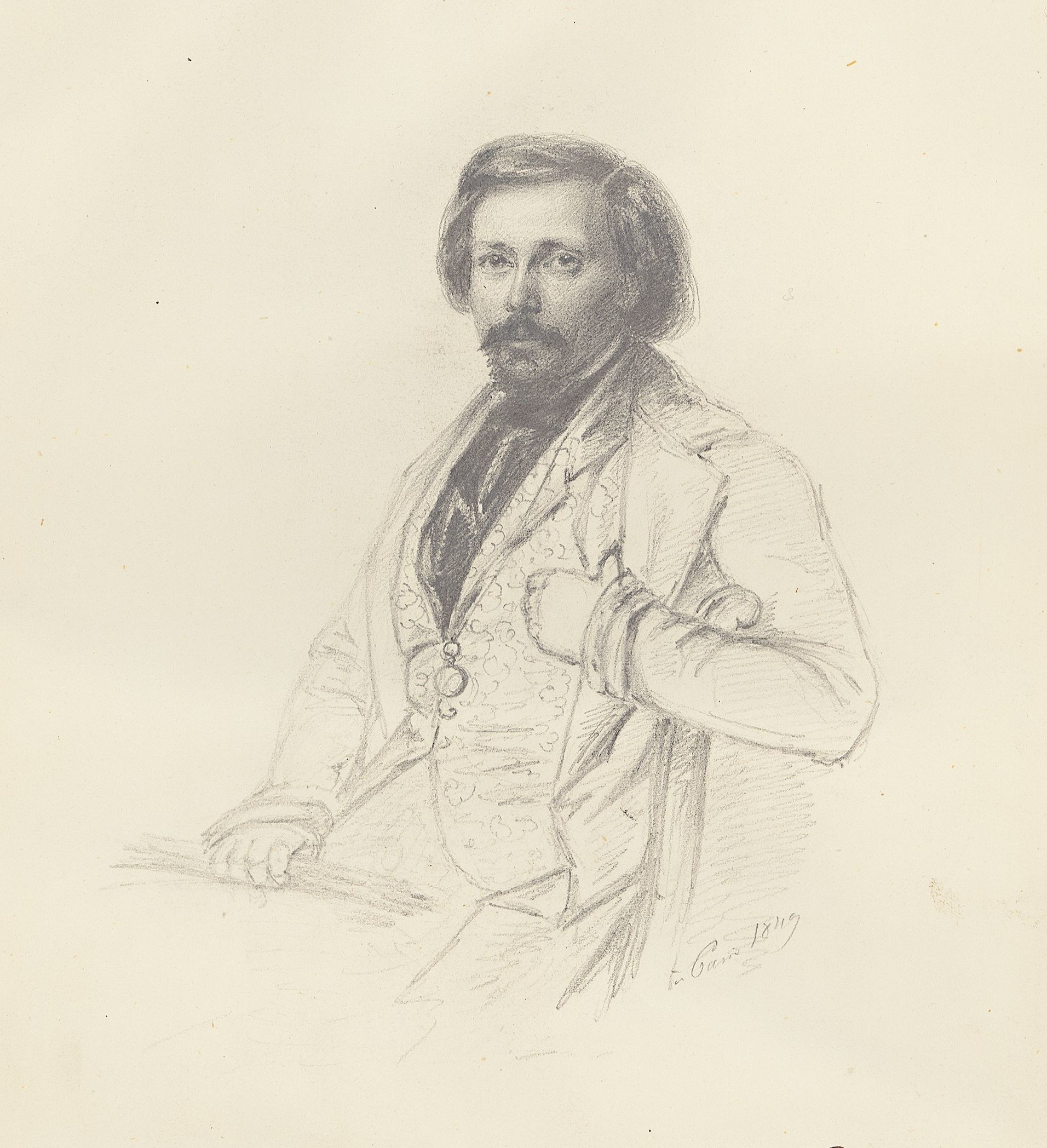
Maria Röhl, Portrait of Jean-François Brémond, Paris, 1849

Jean-François Brémond, a pupil of Ingres and Couder, was born in Paris in 1807. He produced portraits as well as historical pictures. His death occurred in Paris in 1868. Among his paintings are:

- Portrait of his Daughter.
- St. Francis of Assisi.
- St. Catharine of Alexandria.
- The Entry of Christ into Jerusalem.
- Bogwali the Great of 69th.
- Susannah in the Bath.
