= Franz Wenzel, Graf von Kaunitz-Rietberg =

Austrian general (1742–1825)

Graf Franz Wenzel Kaunitz-Rietberg
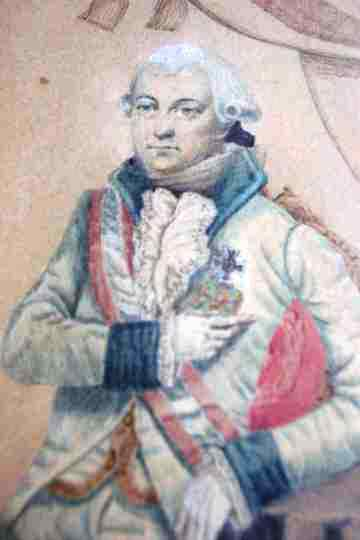
- Born: 2 July 1742; Vienna, Habsburg monarchy
- Died: 19 December 1825 (aged 83) Vienna, Austrian Empire
- Allegiance: Holy Roman Empire; • Habsburg monarchy
- Branch: Army of the Holy Roman Empire; • Imperial-Royal Army
- Rank: General of Artillery
- Conflicts: First Coalition (Grand-Reng, Erquelinnes)

Franz Wenzel, Graf von Kaunitz-Rietberg (2 July 1742 – 19 December 1825) was an Austrian general who saw service in the Seven Years' War and Wars of the French Revolution.

== Early life ==
Kaunitz was the third son of the statesman Wenzel Anton von Kaunitz-Rietberg and his wife, Mary Ernestine (née Countess Starhemberg). He remained unmarried.

== Military career ==
Kaunitz was given a military education and volunteered to join the Austrian army at the beginning of the Seven Years' War as an ensign in the Trautmannsdorf Cuirassiers. He transferred to the Daun Infantry Regiment in 1759, and under Field Marshal Leopold Joseph von Daun rose to the position of Wing Adjutant, distinguishing himself at the Battle of Torgau, where he was severely wounded. After the peace of Hubertusburg in 1763, he was promoted to Colonel of the Baden Infantry Regiment (IR; later IR.23), and then in 1766 of the Emperor Joseph II Infantry Regiment (later IR.1). In 1773, he was promoted to General-Major. In the same year, he was appointed as Inhaber (Proprietor) of IR.38, followed in 1785 by IR.20. Promoted to Feldmarschall-Leutnant (FML) in 1783, he served as military commander in Croatia.

At the beginning of the Wars of the French Revolution, he was made Feldzeugmeister (FZM) in the Austrian Netherlands under Prince Josias of Saxe-Coburg-Saalfeld and served in the Flanders Campaign. Commanding Coburg's 27,000 man left wing, Kaunitz distinguished himself defending the line of the River Sambre in 1794, beating off Jacques Desjardin and Louis Charbonnier at the Battle of Grandreng on 13 May before completely routing the French at the Battle of Erquelinnes on 24 May. However, he resigned on 30 May after the Prince of Orange was appointed over his head for political reasons. Kaunitz commanded a column at the Battle of Fleurus on 26 June.

In 1796, he was made commanding general in Galicia and in 1805 in Moravia. The following year, he resigned from active service.

== Death and legacy ==
As the last of the family line of Kaunitz-Rietberg, he died in Palais Kaunitz, Mariahilfer, and was buried in the family grave in Austerlitz (now Slavkov u Brna).

Kaunitz was a member of the Masonic Lodge in Brno.

Military offices
Preceded by Carl Merode d'Aynse	Proprietor (Inhaber) of Infantry Regiment Nr. 38; 1766–1785	Succeeded by Duke Ferdinand Frederick Augustus of Württemberg
Military offices
Preceded by Anton von Colloredo-Waldsee	Proprietor (Inhaber) of Infantry Regiment Nr. 20; 1785–1825	Succeeded by unknown
