= Battle of Fleurus order of battle =

In the Battle of Fleurus (26 June 1794) Jean-Baptiste Jourdan's French army repulsed an attack by the combined Austro-Dutch army led by Prince Josias of Saxe-Coburg-Saalfeld. Tactically the battle was a draw but strategically it was a decisive French victory. The battle led to the collapse of the Coalition position in the Austrian Netherlands.

== Key ==
- GdD = General de Division, army or division commander
- GdB = General de Brigade, division or brigade commander
- FM = Feldmarschall, army commander
- FML = Feldmarschall-Leutnant, column commander
- GM = General-major, brigade commander
- bns = infantry battalions
- sqns = cavalry squadrons
- Émigré = French Royalists

== French army ==
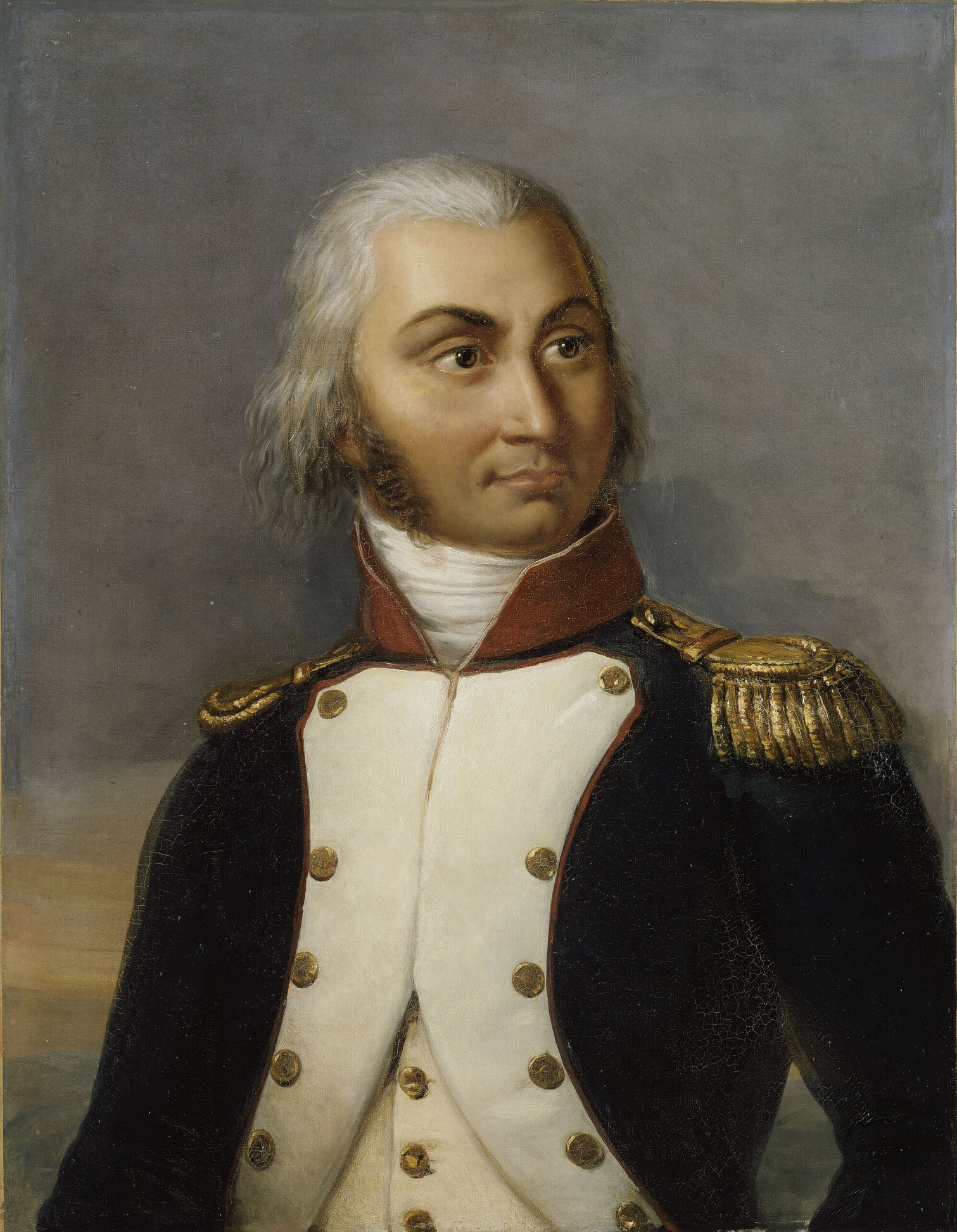
Jean-Baptiste Jourdan

General de Division Jean-Baptiste Jourdan (75,000)

- Reserve artillery
  - Two foot artillery companies

=== Army of the Moselle ===
GdD Jean-Baptiste Jourdan

- GdD Jacques Maurice Hatry (11,000)
  - GdB Jean-Antoine Chapsal
    - 27th Line Infantry Regiment, 1st Battalion
    - 44th Line Infantry Regiment, 1st Battalion
    - Moselle National Guard, 2nd and 3rd battalions
    - Côte-d'Or National Guard, 3rd Battalion
    - Seine-et-Oise National Guard, 6th Battalion
    - Doubs National Guard, 9th Battalion
    - 11th Dragoon Regiment, three squadrons
    - 18th Chasseurs à Cheval, one squadron
  - GdB Jean Pierre François Bonet
    - 33rd Line Infantry Regiment, 2nd Battalion
    - 58th Line Infantry Regiment, 2nd Battalion
    - Lot-et-Garonne National Guard, 1st Battalion
    - Loiret National Guard, 2nd Battalion
    - Var National Guard, 4th Battalion
  - One foot artillery company
- GdD Antoine Morlot (8,600)
  - GdB Jean-Baptiste Olivier
    - 110th Line Infantry Regiment, three battalions
    - 14th Dragoon Regiment, three squadrons
  - GdB Henri Simon
    - 1st Line Infantry Regiment, three battalions
    - 34th Line Infantry Regiment, three battalions
    - 10th Cavalry Regiment, four squadrons
  - One foot artillery company
- GdD Jean Étienne Championnet (9,100)
  - GdB Paul Grenier
    - 18th Line Infantry Regiment, three battalions
    - 1st Dragoon Regiment, three squadrons
  - GdB Claude Juste Alexandre Legrand
    - 59th Line Infantry Regiment, three battalions
    - 94th Line Infantry Regiment, three battalions
    - 4th Cavalry Regiment, three squadrons
  - One foot artillery company
- GdD François Joseph Lefebvre (8,800)
  - GdB Jean François Leval
    - 5th Line Infantry Regiment, 1st Battalion
    - 54th Line Infantry Regiment, 2nd Battalion
    - 99th Line Infantry Regiment, 2nd Battalion
    - 9th Foot Chasseurs Battalion
  - GdB Jean-Baptiste Jacopin
    - 13th Line Infantry Regiment, three battalions
    - 80th Line Infantry Regiment, three battalions
    - 149th Line Infantry Regiment, three battalions
  - GdB Jean Sultzmann
    - 16th Light Infantry Battalion
    - 1st Foot Chasseurs Battalion
    - 18th Foot Chasseurs Battalion
    - Legion of the Moselle
  - One foot artillery company

=== Army of the North ===
GdD Jean Baptiste Kléber

- GdB Guillaume Philibert Duhesme (10,000)
  - GdB Jean Schlachter
    - Saint-Denis National Guard, 1st Battalion
    - Vosges National Guard, 5th Battalion
    - 4th Hussar Regiment, four squadrons
    - 12th Chasseurs à Cheval Regiment, five squadrons
  - GdB Louis Fuzier
    - 47th Line Infantry Demi-brigade, three battalions
    - Vienne National Guard, 2nd Battalion
    - Paris National Guard, 10th Battalion
    - Seine-et-Oise National Guard, 10th Battalion
  - GdB Jean-Baptiste Bernadotte
    - 56th Line Infantry Demi-brigade, three battalions
    - 32nd Light Infantry Battalion
    - Orne National Guard, 1st Battalion
    - Meurthe National Guard, 2nd Battalion
    - 22nd Cavalry Regiment, four squadrons
  - One foot artillery company
- GdD Anne Charles Basset Montaigu (8,200)
  - GdB Joseph Léonard Richard
    - 10th Light Infantry Battalion
    - 4th Foot Chasseur Battalion
    - 6th Cavalry Regiment, one squadron
    - 7th Dragoon Regiment, four squadrons
    - 16th Chasseurs à Cheval Regiment, one squadron
  - GdB André Poncet
    - 18th Line Infantry Demi-brigade, 1st Battalion
    - 49th Line Infantry Demi-brigade, 1st Battalion
    - 68th Line Infantry Demi-brigade, 1st and 2nd Battalions
    - 89th Line Infantry Demi-brigade, 1st Battalion
  - GdB Joseph Boisset
    - Calvados National Guard, 2nd Battalion
    - Haut-Rhine National Guard, 2nd and 3rd battalions
    - Mayenne-et-Loire National Guard, 2nd Battalion
    - Nièvre National Guard, 2nd Battalion
    - Eure National Guard, 3rd Battalion
    - Somme National Guard, 5th Battalion
    - Oise National Guard, 6th Battalion
  - Two foot artillery companies
- Detached from GdD Marie-Louis Ferrand
  - GdB Charles Daurier (6,000)
    - 18th Line Infantry Demi-brigade, 2nd Battalion
    - 72nd Line Infantry Demi-brigade, 1st and 2nd battalions
    - Loiret National Guard, 1st Battalion
    - 17th Cavalry Regiment, four squadrons
    - One foot artillery company
- Cavalry Division: Paul-Alexis Dubois (2,300)
  - GdB Jean-Joseph Ange d'Hautpoul
    - 12th Dragoon Regiment, four squadrons
    - 2nd Hussar Regiment, two squadrons
    - 6th Chasseurs à Cheval Regiment, four squadrons
    - One horse artillery company
  - GdB Guillaume Soland
    - 6th Cavalry Regiments, four squadrons
    - 8th Cavalry Regiments, four squadrons
    - One horse artillery company

=== Army of the Ardennes ===
GdD François Séverin Marceau-Desgraviers

- GdD Marceau (6,000)
  - GdB Jean Thomas Guillaume Lorge
    - 9th Line Infantry Regiment, three battalions
    - 172nd Line Infantry Regiment, three battalions
    - Nord National Guard, 3rd Battalion
    - Pas-de-Calais National Guard, 8th Battalion
  - GdB Jean Hardy
    - Vendee National Guard, 1st Battalion
    - Volunteers National Guard, 2nd Battalion
    - 11th Chasseurs à Cheval, four squadrons
  - One foot artillery company
- GdD Jean Adam Mayer (5,500)
  - GdB Jean Charles Prestat
    - 26th Line Infantry Regiment, three battalions
    - Nord National Guard, 2nd Battalion
    - Seine-Inférieur National Guard, 7th Battalion
  - GdB Claude Lecourbe
    - 16th Light Infantry Battalion
    - Aisne National Guard, 4th Battalion
    - 20th Chasseurs à Cheval, two squadrons
  - One foot artillery company

== Austrian-Dutch army ==
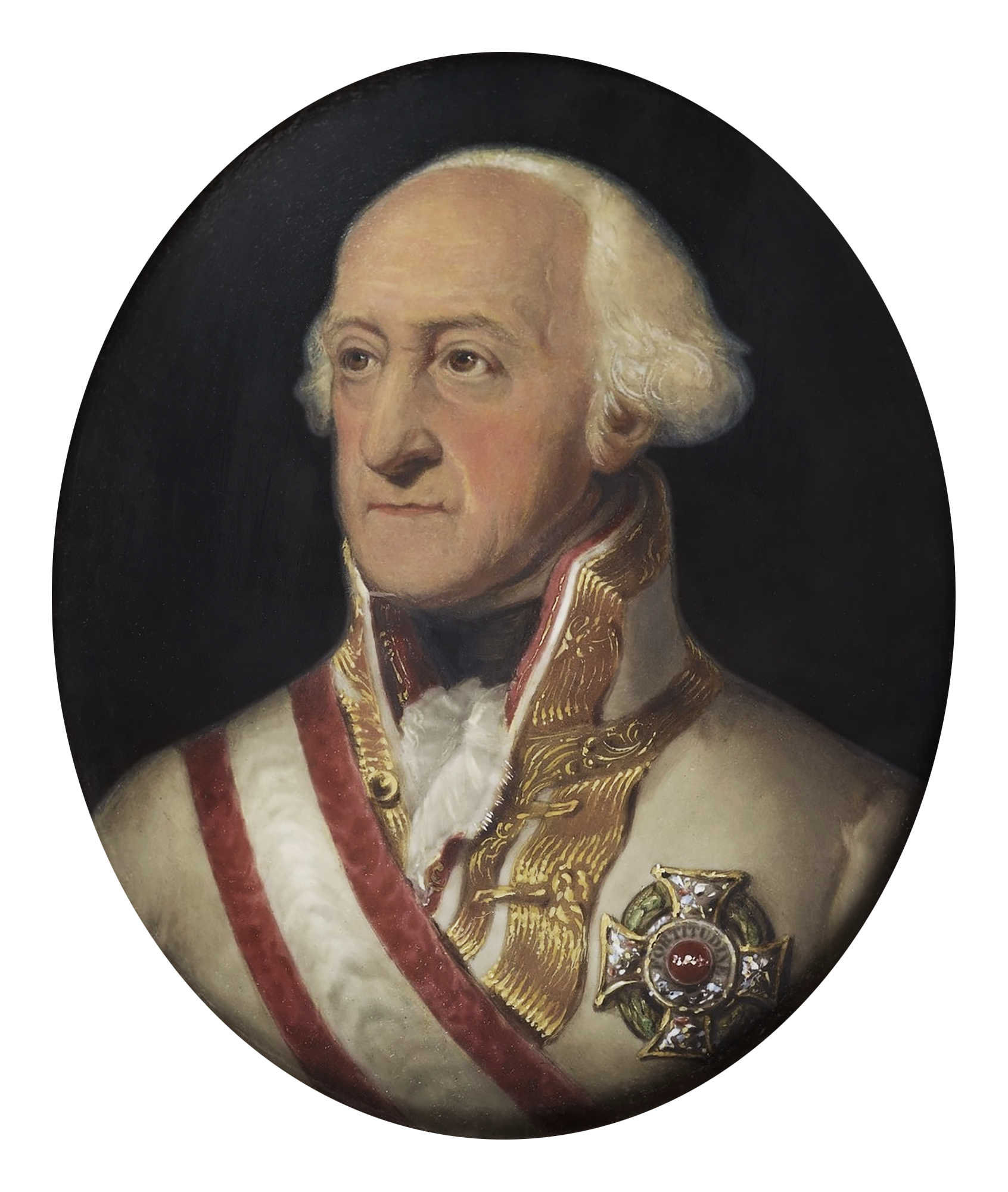
Josias of Saxe-Coburg

FM Prince Josias of Coburg (32,000 infantry, 14,000 cavalry)

- 1st Column: Prince of Orange
  - Brigade: Lieutenant General Prince of Waldeck
    - 8 Dutch bns, 8 Dutch sqns, 2 Émigré sqns
  - Brigade: Major General Prince Frederick of Orange-Nassau
    - 6 Dutch bns, 2 Swiss bns, 10 Dutch sqns, 2 Émigré sqns
  - Brigade: GM Johann Sigismund Riesch
    - 2 Austrian bns, 3 Émigré bns, 2 Émigré sqns
- 2nd Column: FML Peter Quasdanovich
  - Brigade: 7 1/3 Austrian bns, 16 guns
- 3rd Column: FML Franz Wenzel, Graf von Kaunitz-Rietberg
  - Brigade: 5 Austrian bns, 3 Austrian sqns, 2(?) Émigré sqns, 16 guns
- 4th Column: FML Archduke Charles
  - Brigade: 7 1/3 Austrian bns, 16 sqns, 18 guns
- 5th Column: FML Johann Peter Beaulieu
  - Brigade: 16 Austrian bns, 20 Austrian sqns, 2 Émigré sqns, 18 guns
