= Paul-Alexis Dubois =

Alexis Dubois
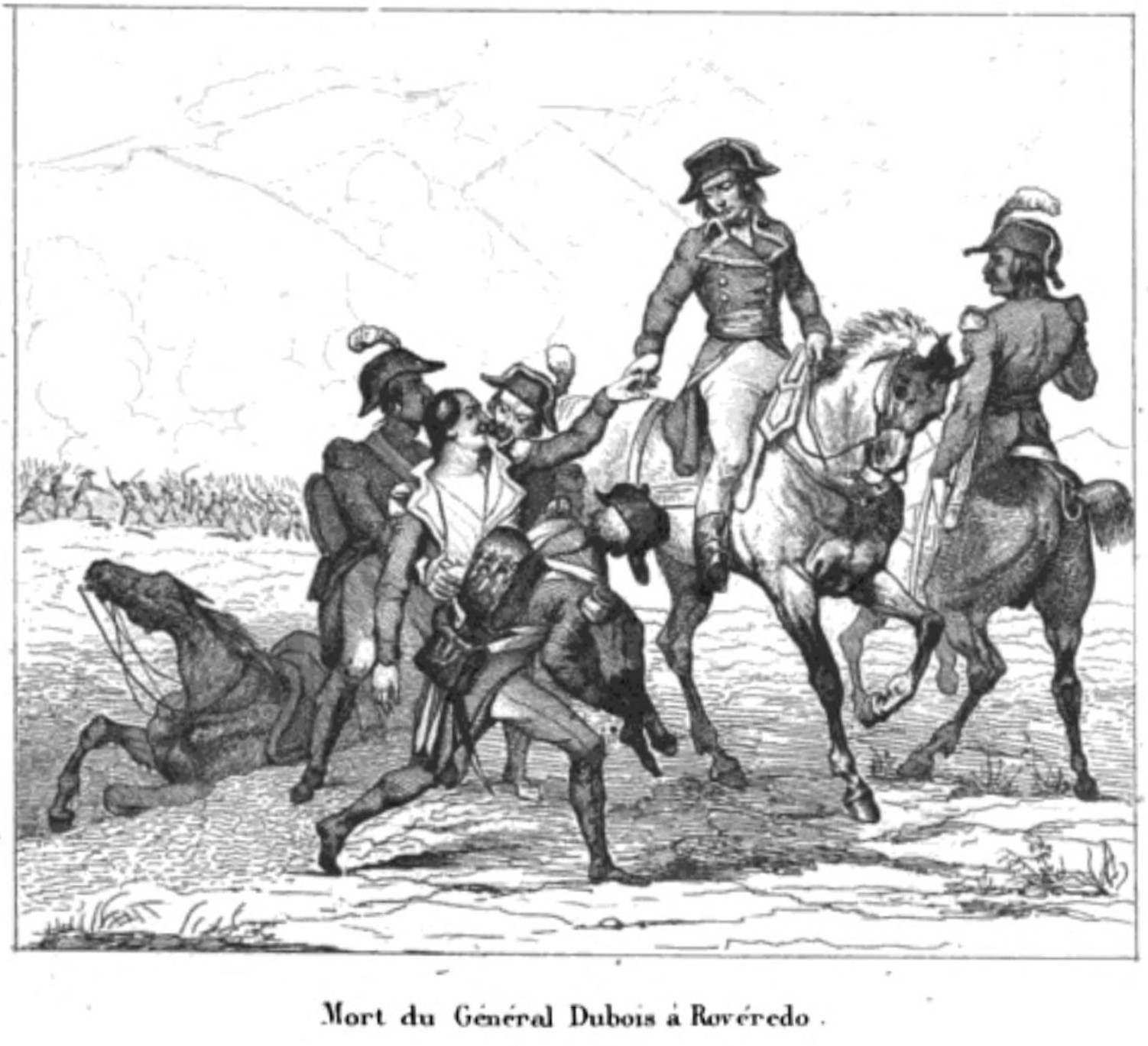
- Death of General Dubois at Rovereto (La France militaire, 1835)
- Born: 27 January 1754; Guise, France
- Died: 4 September 1796 (aged 42) Rovereto, Italy
- Allegiance: Kingdom of France; France
- Branch: Infantry, Cavalry
- Service years: 1770–1796
- Rank: General of Division
- Conflicts: War of the First Coalition; First Battle of Wissembourg; Battle of Kaiserslautern; Battle of Froeschwiller; Battle of Lambusart; Battle of Fleurus; Battle of Aldenhoven; Revolt of 20 May 1795; Battle of Rovereto †

Paul-Alexis Dubois (French pronunciation: [pɔl alɛksi dybwa]; 27 January 1754 – 4 September 1796) commanded French divisions during the War of the First Coalition and was killed in action fighting against Habsburg Austria. He enlisted in a French infantry regiment in 1770 and transferred into the cavalry in 1776. Thereafter he served in several different cavalry and infantry regiments. From sous-lieutenant in 1791, he served in the Army of the Moselle and was rapidly promoted to general of brigade by August 1793. After briefly commanding an infantry division in the Army of the Rhine at Wissembourg he switched back to the Army of the Moselle to fight at Kaiserslautern before being wounded at Froeschwiller in December 1793.

Promoted to general of division in March 1794, Dubois led a cavalry division in the Army of Sambre-et-Meuse at Lambusart, Fleurus and Aldenhoven. In May 1795 he helped put down the Revolt of 1 Prairial Year III. After garrison duty he was able to get transferred to Italy. He was fatally hit while leading the cavalry at the Battle of Rovereto and died the same day. His surname is one of the names inscribed under the Arc de Triomphe, on Column 25.

== Early career ==
Dubois was born on 27 January 1754 at Guise in what later became the Aisne department in France. He joined the Lyonnais Infantry Regiment of French Royal Army on 16 August 1770. He transferred into the Monsieur Dragoon Regiment on 6 June 1776, followed by subsequent moves into the Royal-Normandie Cavalry Regiment on 22 December 1777 and the 5th Chevau-léger Regiment on 28 May 1779. He was promoted to brigadier, a non-commissioned officer rank, on 5 April 1780. He joined the Quercy Infantry Regiment on 25 July 1784 and was appointed maréchal de logis on 16 September the same year. He advanced to maréchal de logis en chef on 16 June 1785 and to adjutant on 29 December 1786. He became port-guidon (guidon bearer) in the 11th Chasseurs à Cheval Regiment on 15 May 1788.

== War: 1791–1793 ==
Soon after the French Revolution Dubois advanced into the lesser grades of officer. He was promoted to sous-lieutenant on 1 March 1791, first lieutenant on 17 June 1792 and captain on 5 August the same year. In 1792 he fought with the Army of the Moselle. He assumed the rank of lieutenant colonel in the 17th Dragoons on 26 January 1793. He was promoted to chef de brigade (colonel) of the 1st Regiment of Liberté Hussars on 28 May 1793 and he became general of brigade on 24 August 1793. For part of the year he was deputy chief of staff in the Army of the Ardennes.

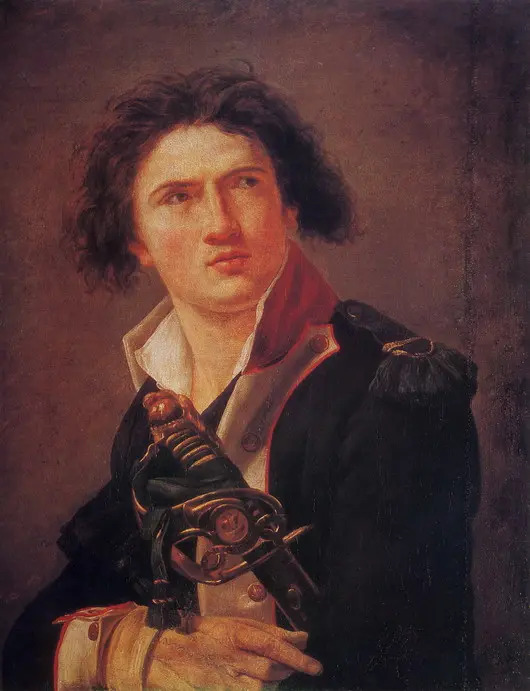
Lazare Hoche

The First Battle of Wissembourg found Dubois in command of the Right Wing of the Army of Rhine. His brigade commanders were Claude Ignace François Michaud and Claude Juste Alexandre Legrand. The Right wing included two battalions of the 37th Line Infantry and single battalions of the 11th Light, 40th, 75th and 79th Line Infantry. There were 10 National Guard battalions plus the 4th Dragoons and 2nd Chasseurs à Cheval. The French government dismissed the previous army commander but none of the generals wanted the post because they had seen such generals as Adam Philippe Custine and Jean Nicolas Houchard sent to the guillotine. In desperation, the representatives on mission selected Jean Pascal Carlenc, a good cavalry officer but incompetent as commander-in-chief. To add more trouble, on 10 October the army's chief of staff Henri Jacques Guillaume Clarke was dismissed for suspected sympathy with aristocrats. In the midst of this chaos, the 43,185-strong Coalition army under Dagobert Sigmund von Wurmser attacked on 13 October 1793. Dubois did not distinguish himself, withdrawing from his position when it was unnecessary. Carlec refused to order a counterattack unless authorized to do so by the political representatives, so the army fell back almost to Strasbourg. Dubois was replaced by Louis Desaix.

The Army of the Moselle also suffered from disruptive changes of army leaders. On 31 October 1793 Lazare Hoche replaced its acting commander. The new leader was handicapped by the arrest and dismissal of so many generals. Evidently Hoche thought favorably toward Dubois because he wrote at this time, "[Jean René] Moreaux and Dubois have just arrived; [Édouard] Huet and [François Joseph] Lefebvre, recently promoted, have begun work: these four generals will much relieve me." Dubois led the army's Advance Guard in the Battle of Kaiserslautern on 28–30 November. His force consisted of 12 field guns in two horse artillery companies, four squadrons each of the 1st Carabiniers-à-Cheval and 1st Dragoons, three squadrons of the 3rd Hussars, one squadron of the 7th Hussars, five infantry companies and three half-squadrons from various cavalry units. Water-logged roads kept Hoche's main body out of action on the 28th, but Dubois joined one of Jean-Jacques Ambert's brigades in a morning assault on 29 November. After suffering many casualties, the French crossed the Otterbach stream and advanced against the main Prussian position. Over the next two days, the French attacks failed and Hoche was compelled to order a retreat. Dubois was hit in the leg by a musket ball in the Battle of Froeschwiller on 22 December 1793. In this engagement, the Army of the Moselle turned Wurmser's right flank and forced him to retreat from his defenses at Haguenau and along the river Moder.

== War: 1794–1796 ==
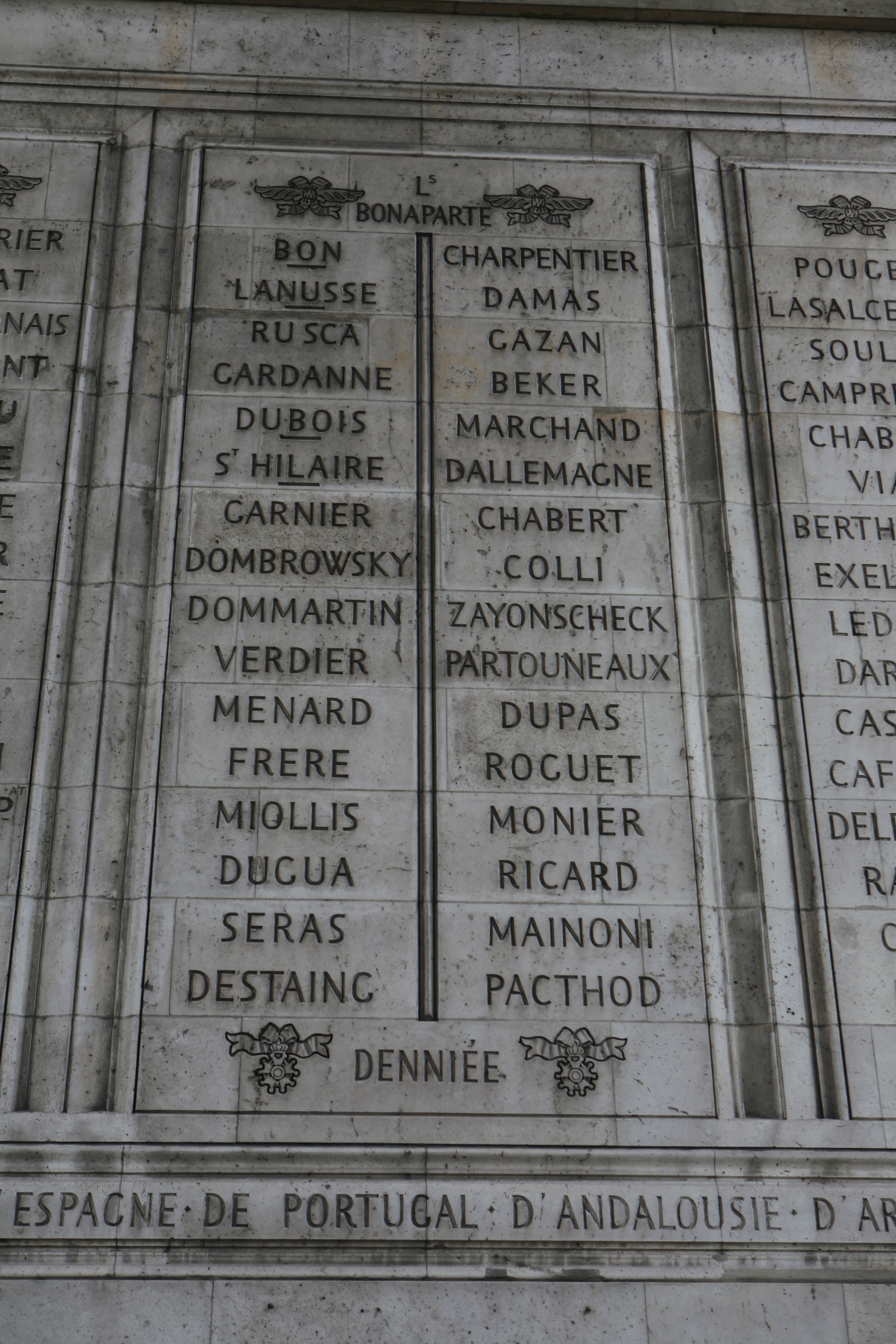
Dubois is on Column 25 at left.

Dubois was provisionally appointed general of division on 10 March 1794. This promotion was confirmed on 30 March. He arrived at Guise to take command of the cavalry brigades from the divisions of Antoine Balland and Jacques Gilles Henri Goguet. Dubois attempted to impose discipline on the unruly and riotous regiments. Unfortunately the organizations were changing constantly, preventing him from accomplishing much. After Goguet was assassinated by his own troops on 21 April, Dubois took over the division. On 4 May, Dubois' division counted 11,353 soldiers and was posted at Bohéries Abbey near Guise. Balland's 12,701-man division and Dubois' division made up the center of the Army of the North under Jacques Ferrand. After 10 May, the brigade of Jean-Joseph Ange d'Hautpoul was sent to the right wing of the Army of the North. On 26 May, Dubois left with a second cavalry brigade to join the right wing at Maubeuge. He took command of a cavalry division assembled at Ham-sur-Heure on 10 June 1794. The 2,315 troopers were divided into brigades under Hautpoul and Guillaume Soland, each with a horse artillery battery attached. Hautpoul led the 12th Dragoons (406), 2nd Hussars (265) and 6th Chasseurs-à-Cheval (624) while Soland led the 6th Cavalry (550) and 8th Cavalry (470).

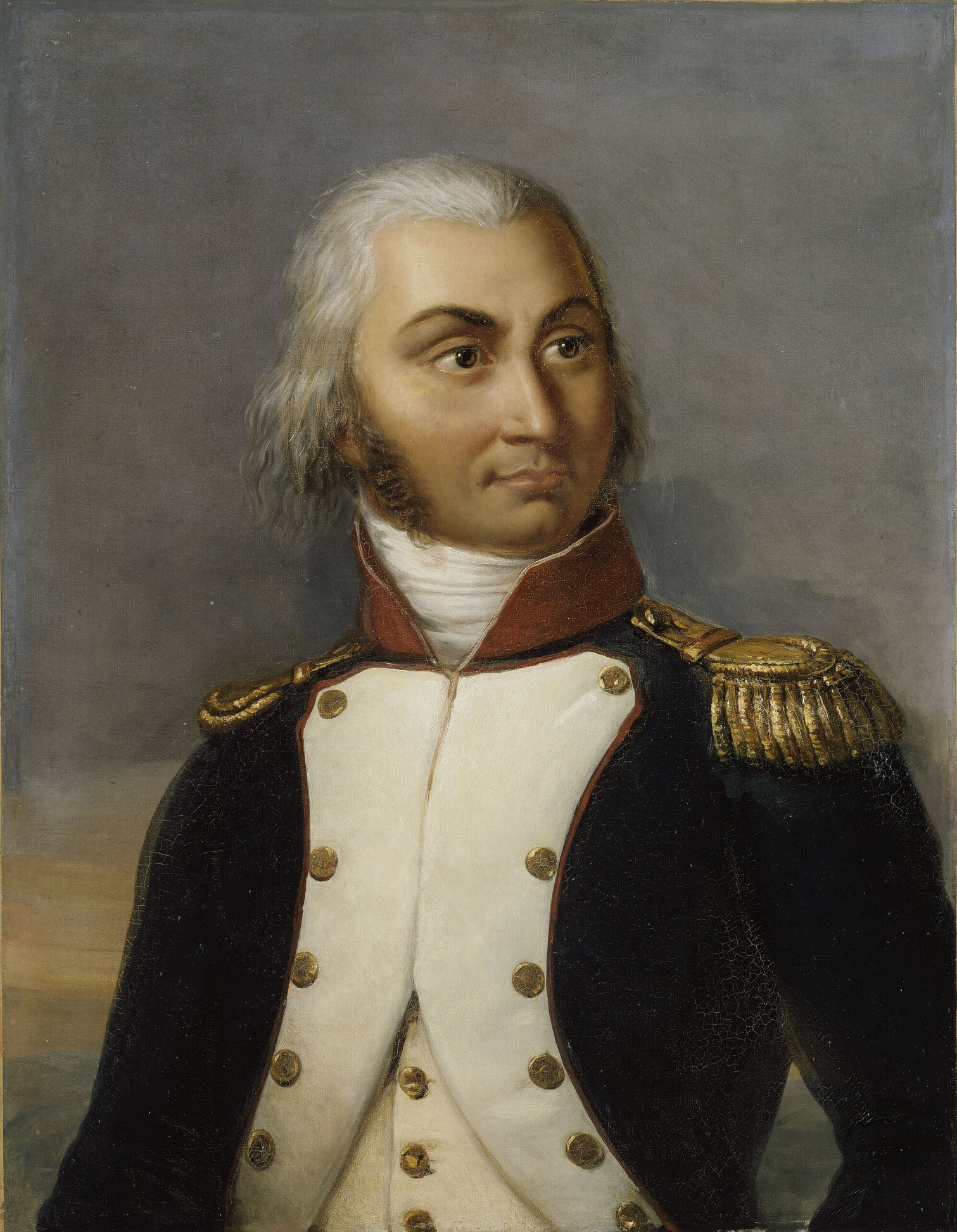
Jean-Baptiste Jourdan

On 12 June 1794, Jean-Baptiste Jourdan's army crossed the Sambre River and the Austrian-held fortress of Charleroi was placed under siege. The cavalry of Dubois accompanied the infantry divisions of Jean Étienne Championnet and Antoine Morlot and took post at Ransart. The Battle of Lambusart was fought on 16 June and resulted in a French defeat. Prince William of Orange who commanded the Coalition army attacked the French in four columns, with the main weight in the 1st and 2nd Columns against the French right flank. The French left flank troops were successful against the 4th Column. As the 3rd Column under Peter Vitus von Quosdanovich deployed in front of Morlot's division, Jourdan ordered the cavalry to attack. Accordingly, Dubois led the 10th Cavalry (of Morlot's division) and 6th Chasseurs-à-Cheval in a brilliant cavalry charge, capturing 600 enemy soldiers and seven cannons. Unfortunately Jourdan soon received news that his right flank had collapsed, causing him to order a withdrawal.

Undeterred, Jourdan spent one day reorganizing his defeated army and then advanced across the Sambre on 18 June, reinvesting Charleroi. The Prince of Orange's troops took position at Rouveroy to the west of Charleroi while Johann Peter Beaulieu's division blocked the road to the north at Quatre Bras. The overall Coalition commander Prince Josias of Saxe-Coburg-Saalfeld dithered over what to do, then finally decided to help the Prince of Orange. When Coburg's 52,000-man army reached the scene, it was too late; Charleroi had surrendered to the French. As on the 16th, Jourdan's 75,000 troops formed a semi-circle around Charleroi. In the Battle of Fleurus on 26 June 1794 Coburg formed his army into five attacking columns. Dubois' cavalry was positioned near Ransart behind the center together with Jacques Maurice Hatry's infantry division. Again, Jourdan's right flank was swept away by the Coalition attack. Lefebvre wheeled back the right flank of his division and placed it under the orders of Jean-de-Dieu Soult. Some soldiers and cannons from the routed right wing rallied on it. Jourdan issued orders for a retreat but, finding that Lefebvre was still holding on, he countermanded the order. Championnet's division had just begun pulling out. Jourdan directed Dubois' cavalry to charge the enemy; the horsemen were repulsed, but Championnet's foot soldiers attacked next and regained their former positions. After a see-saw struggle on the left flank, the French managed to hold their ground there also. Coburg in person hurled his battalions at Lefebvre but every assault was beaten back. That evening Coburg conceded victory to the French and retreated to Braine-l'Alleud.

On 6 and 17 July 1794 Dubois led his troopers in clashes against the Coalition forces. He fought in the Battle of Aldenhoven on 2 October where he led the 4,000-strong cavalry reserve. He got into an argument with the supply department which caused a rupture with Jourdan. He left the army early in 1795. The Revolt of 1 Prairial Year III broke out on 20 May 1795 when a crowd of armed people, burst into the National Convention and assassinated a deputy. In Paris at the time, Dubois was given command of the capital's cavalry on the 21st. The next day soldiers under Jean-Charles Pichegru crushed the revolt. Dubois returned to the Army of the North where he commanded the Jemappes department. Chafing at this inactive role, he asked for a transfer to the Army of Italy to replace the slain Amédée Emmanuel François Laharpe; the request was granted. On 4 September 1796 Dubois was hit by three musket balls while leading his horsemen at the Battle of Rovereto. The fatally wounded general gasped out to Napoleon Bonaparte, "I die for the Republic. Do I have the time to know if the victory is complete?" DUBOIS is on Column 25 of the Arc de Triomphe. (Note: See photo of the Arc de Triomphe. The underline indicates that Dubois was killed in action.)

== Notes ==
Footnotes

Citations
