= Battle of Aldenhoven (1794) =

1794 Battle during the War of the First Coalition

- Part of War of the First Coalition
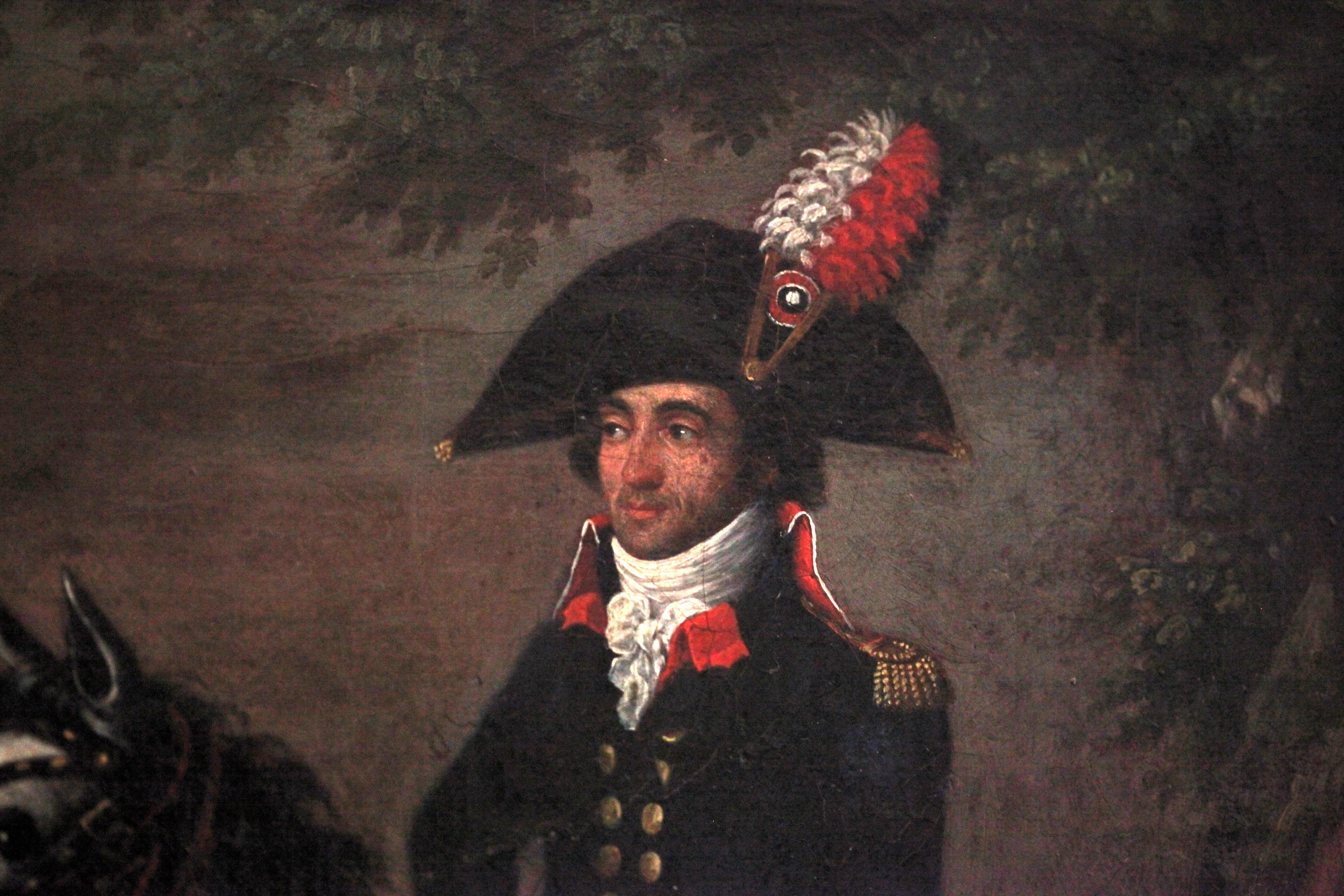
- General Jean Baptiste Jourdan
Date	2 October 1794
Location	Aldenhoven, Germany 50°53′45″N 6°16′59″E
Result	French victory

Belligerents
(France) French Republic	Habsburg monarchy

Commanders and leaders
(France) General Jourdan	(Habsburg monarchy) Count of Clerfayt

Units involved
Army of Sambre-et-Meuse	Austrian Army

Strength
88,000	77,000

Casualties and losses
1,500 killed or wounded	3,000 killed or wounded 800 captured
- Location within Europe

The Battle of Aldenhoven or Battle of the Roer (2 October 1794) saw a Republican French army commanded by Jean Baptiste Jourdan defeat a Habsburg army under François Sébastien Charles Joseph de Croix, Count of Clerfayt which was defending the line of the Roer River. A key crossing was won by the French right wing at Düren after heavy fighting. The Austrian retreat from the Roer conceded control of the west bank of the Rhine River to France. The battle occurred during the War of the First Coalition, part of a wider conflict called the Wars of the French Revolution. Aldenhoven is located in the state of North Rhine-Westphalia in Germany about 21 kilometres (13 mi) northeast of Aachen.

== Background ==
The Flanders campaign of 1794 saw the French Army of the North and Army of the Ardennes under General Charles Pichegru, and later elements of the Army of the Moselle under General Jean-Baptiste Jourdan, attack both flanks of the Coalition army facing them.

After the pivotal battle of Fleurus on 26 June 1794, the Coalition army began what would become a general retreat out of Flanders, as the Austrian government had decided at this point that the Austrian Netherlands were too much trouble to hold on to. As French pressure forced the Coalition army further and further back, it divided into two major forces on divergent routes of retreat dictated by their governments’ political objectives, as the British and Dutch fell back northwards to defend the Dutch Republic, while the Austrians fell back eastwards to defend the Rhine.

== The Austrian Retreat to the Roer ==
After the battle of Fleurus, the Allied army, then under Prince Coburg, initially withdrew to Mont St. Jean. On 1 July, after the French armies that had defeated them under the battle, now formally constituted as the Army of Sambre-and-Meuse under Jourdan, captured Mons on their flank, they commenced a retreat towards Brussels.

At this point, although the British and Dutch contingents in the allied army remained nominally under Coburg’s command, the Austrian and the Anglo-Dutch forces functioned essentially separately and with no regard for one another. On 5 July at Waterloo, Prince Coburg and the Duke of York, commander of the British contingent, agreed to defend a line from Antwerp to Louvain, Wavre, Gembloux and Namur, but Coburg promptly cancelled this agreement the next day when attacked by Jourdan and retreated with the Austrians towards Malines (Mechelen) and Louvain (Leuven), vacating Brussels along the way.

Attacked further on 7-8 July, and compelled to relinquish Namur, Coburg moved the Austrians even further back to a line centred on Tirlemont. A week later, French attacks captured Malines and Louvain, prompting Coburg to begin a retreat back across the Meuse, eventually crossing at Maastricht on 24 July, occupying a defensive line on the east bank.

Following this retreat, Coburg had resigned, and was replaced by Count Clerfayt. The Austrians held their position on the Meuse through August, as the Army of Sambre-and-Meuse awaited the return of some 40,000 men that had been detached under Barthelemy Scherer to besiege and recapture Coalition fortified towns that had now been abandoned in the rear following the allied retreat.

Upon Scherer’s return on 4 September, Jourdan, now strong enough, launched an attack that crumpled Clerfayt’s left flank at the battle of the Ourthe, also known as the battle of Sprimont. With his entire position on the Meuse now outflanked and compromised, Clerfayt was forced to retreat further back the Roer river, the last river defence line before the Rhine itself.

== French Order of Battle ==
The French Army of Sambre-and-Meuse that fought at the Roer River was made up of elements from three armies that had been assembled to fight at Fleurus–the right wing of the Army of the North, the Army of the Ardennes, and the left wing of the Army of the Moselle.

Formally constituted as an army on 29 June under the command of Jourdan, the Army after the battle of Sprimont consisted of some 120,000 men in three corps, with the left wing under Jean-Baptiste Kleber, the right under Barthelemy Scherer, and the centre under Jourdan’s personal command.

Days after Sprimont, Jourdan detached some 15,000 men under Philibert Duhesme to besiege Maastricht. The remaining 105,000 men remaining were organised in divisions as follows:

=== Left Wing (Kleber) ===
- Jean-Baptiste Bernadotte
- Louis Friant
- Joseph Léonard Richard

=== Centre (Jourdan) ===
- François Lefebvre
- Jean-Étienne Championnet
- Antoine Morlot
- Jacques Maurice Hatry
- Paul-Alexis Dubois (cavalry division)

=== Right Wing (Scherer) ===
- François Séverin Marceau
- Jean Adam Mayer
- Honoré Alexandre Haquin

== Austrian Positions ==
Clerfayt's 76,000-strong army was deployed behind the steep-banked Roer with its left flank at Düren and its right flank at Roermond.The positions around Aldenhoven were entrenched, as were other portions of the line, and the Austrians had destroyed all bridges and dug up all fords along the river. The river was also running high during this period of time, adding to the defence. Clerfayt placed the bulk of his forces between Düren and Linnich, with an advanced west-bank position at Aldenhoven in front of his center at Jülich. The extreme right was in tenuous communication with the army of the Duke of York near Grave.

== French Plan of Attack ==
On 1 October 1794, Jourdan ordered Schérer and the Right Wing to cross the Roer and seize Düren. In the center, Jourdan directed Morlot and Championnet to capture Aldenhoven in the centre and cross the river at Jülich, while Lefebvre occupied Linnich on their left and Hatry occupied Altorp on their right. Meanwhile, Kléber and the Left Wing were instructed to move upstream from a position opposite Roermond and cross the Roer at Ratheim (near Hückelhoven).

== Battle ==
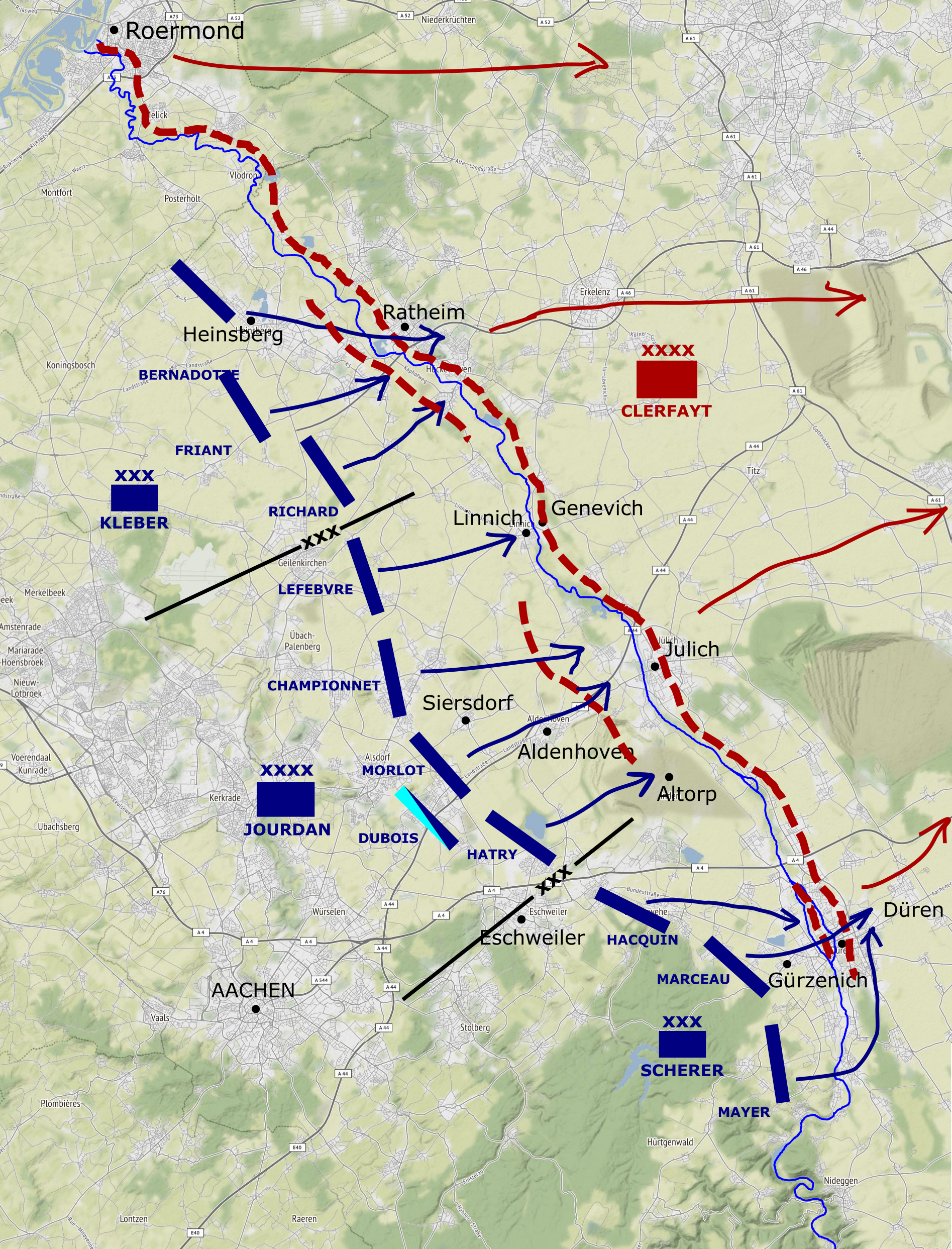
The battle of Aldenhoven, showing the approximate positions of the Coalition defence line and the main thrusts of the French assault. The Roer river is marked in blue.

On 2 October, General Jourdan ordered the Army of Sambre-and-Meuse to force the line of the Roer river, and the 100,000 men of the army attacked on a front of nearly 60 miles from Roermond to Düren. The French were generally on the road through the morning of 2 October and only came into action near mid-day.

=== Attack by the French Left Wing ===
Kleber commenced his advance at 5am. Bernadotte’s regular infantry forced the light troops of Franz von Werneck defending the left bank to retire behind entrenchments and eventually withdraw across the Roer when Kleber's artillery came up, while his light troops reached the Roer amidst heavy artillery and musket fire.

Bernadotte then swam the Roer south of Ratheim with the 71st Demi-Brigade and four companies of grenadiers, supported by artillery moved forward by Kleber. However, despite their success, Kleber’s other divisions were unable to cross until the following day, after the Austrian withdrawal.

During this attack, the future marshal Michel Ney led one cavalry regiment in a charge after crossing the river.

=== Attack by the French Centre ===
The French centre under Jourdan’s direct supervision also achieved success in their attack.

On the left, Lefebvre’s division advanced in a line of battalion columns, captured Linnich, and drove the Austrians back to Genevich on the right bank. He then established a bridge and crossed the Roer the next morning. On the right, Hatry also captured Altorp.

Meanwhile, Championnet’s and Morlot’s divisions advanced towards Aldenhoven. Championnet reported being able to take advantage of the broken terrain in front of his position to rapidly approach and assault the enemy in his front with light artillery and columns of infantry. The divisions captured Aldenhoven and forced the Austrians to fall back to their prepared fortifications behind the town, where they held until they were threatened from the flanks by Lefebvre's and Hatry's successes. They then retreated back across the Roer to Julich.

=== Attack by the French Right Wing ===
Scherer ordered his divisions to advance from their camps at Eschweiler and Gürzenich at 4am. He planned to outflank the Austrian left wing, under Count Latour, with Mayer’s division, while Marceau’s and Hacquin’s divisions frontally assaulted the Austrian defence.

Marceau’s division made considerable progress towards Düren, crossing the Roer by 3pm, but could not advance further without support from Mayer and Hacquin, both of which were delayed in their advances. Mayer’s outflanking move was delayed, but he eventually joined Marceau at 6pm. Together they captured and held Düren and advanced across the Düren plateau, although Mayer’s division was momentarily panicked by a terrible cannonade from a concealed artillery battery. Hacquin then joined them at 7pm from the direction of Eschweiler and the Bergheim forest, but arrived too late in the day to make any contribution to the main attack. Scherer then ordered his troops to bivouac in the field at the end of the day pending a resumption of the attack the next morning.

By the end of the day, Scherer's corps had completely crossed the Roer and captured Düren, outflanking and essentially compromising Clerfayt's entire river defence line.

== Aftermath ==
With only partial success achieved, Jourdan expected to continue the assault on 3 October, but Clerfayt, outnumbered and with his river line already breached on both flanks, withdrew in the night towards the Rhine, crossing to the right bank of the Rhine at Cologne on 6 October. That same day, the French soldiers pursuing Clerfayt occupied the part of the city on the left bank. With Clerfayt’s withdrawal, the French were left in possession of everything on the left bank of the Rhine. Jourdan occupied Bonn and Krefeld on 8 and 9 October, and Cleves (Kleve) on 18 October. Marceau captured Coblenz on 17 October with the help of reinforcements sent from the Army of the Moselle, which was at that time besieging Luxembourg. Dusseldorf was captured on 23 October following a massive bombardment that drove the Austrian garrison out.

Reaching the Rhine also freed Jourdan to reinforce Duhesme at Maastricht, sending Kleber’s corps to enable more aggressive siege operations. Assembling sufficient siege artillery by 23 October, Kleber began bombarding Maastricht on 1 November. With no chance of relief, the city surrendered on 4 November, securing Jourdan’s supply lines.

The battle of Aldenhoven was the last advance undertaken by the Army of Sambre-and-Meuse in 1794. On 25 November, Minister of War Lazare Carnot authorised the Army to go into winter quarters on the banks of the Rhine.

== Notes ==
Preceded by Chouannerie	French Revolution: Revolutionary campaigns Battle of Aldenhoven (1794)	Succeeded by Siege of Luxembourg (1794–1795)
