= Battle of Sprimont =

1794 battle of the French Revolutionary Wars

Coordinates: 50°29′28″N 5°42′18″E

- Part of the War of the First Coalition
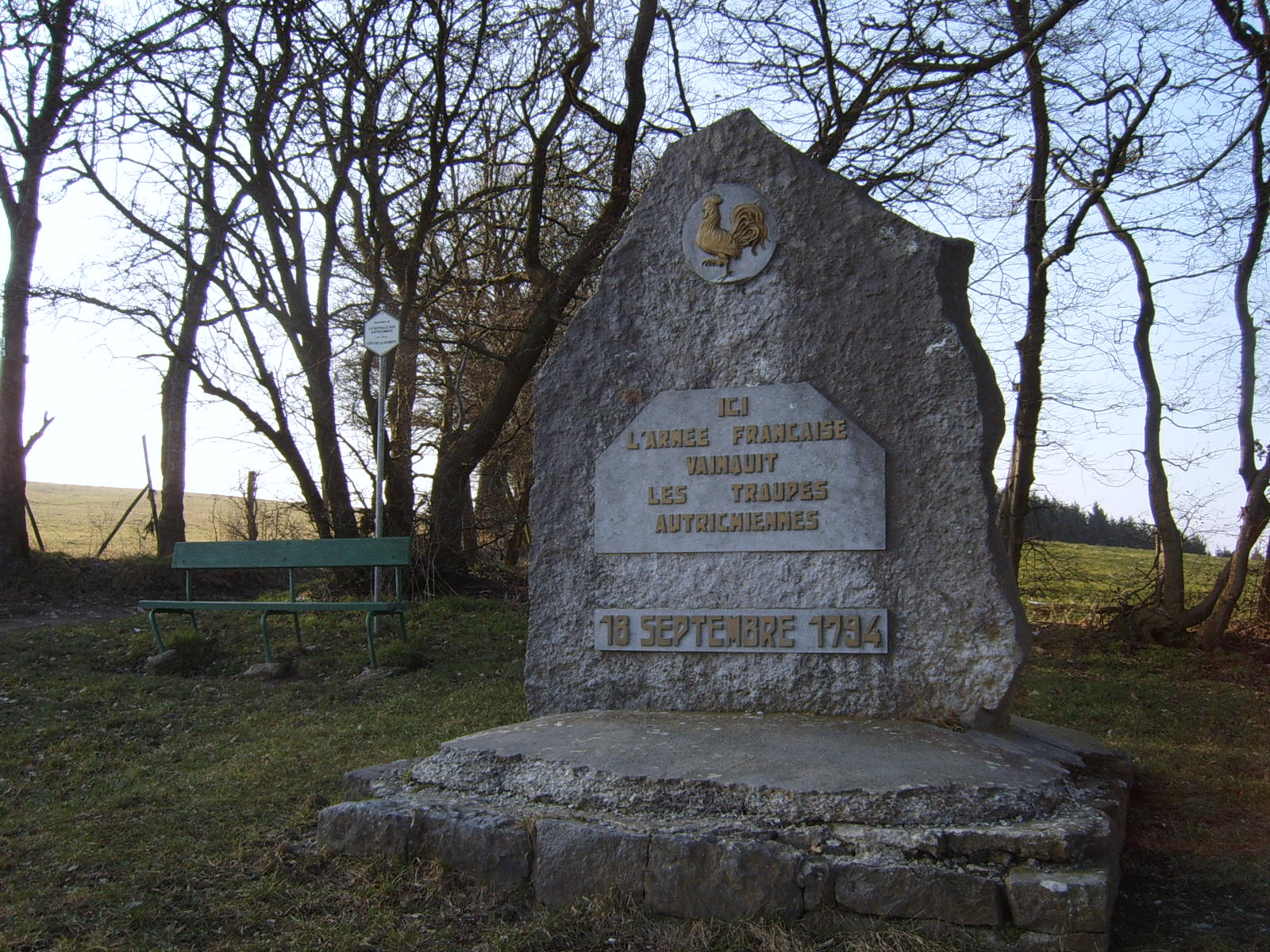
- Monument to the battle.
Date	18 September 1794
Location	Sprimont, near Liège
Result	French victory: France completes annexation of Austrian Netherlands

Belligerents
(France) French Republic	Habsburg Monarchy

Commanders and leaders
(France) Jean-Baptiste Jourdan (France) Barthélemy Louis Joseph Schérer (France) François Marceau (France) Honoré Haquin	Count of Clerfayt (Habsburg monarchy) Count Baillet de Latour

Units involved
Army of Sambre-et-Meuse	Austrian army

Strength
40,000	25,000

The Battle of Sprimont, or Battle of the Ourthe (18 Sep 1794), was a battle during the War of the First Coalition between a corps of the French revolutionary Army of Sambre-and-Meuse under General Jean-Baptiste Jourdan, and the left wing of an Austrian army under the François Sebastien Charles Joseph de Croix, Count of Clerfayt. The battle was fought to outflank and force the Austrian army away from their defensive line on the Meuse river, and was a French victory.

== Background ==
During the War of the First Coalition waged against the French Revolution, European monarchies such as Austria and Prussia, financed by Britain, attempted to invade France and restore the abolished French monarchy. Fighting raged on multiple fronts, from the Pyrenees to the Alps, the Rhine and Flanders (approximately modern Belgium).

Flanders, then owned by Austria, was a key theatre of the war due to its relatively open terrain and its proximity to the French northern border, which was the only sector where there was no strong natural defensive boundary to protect from invasion. By 1794, both sides had already fought over it for years. The Allied Coalition army of Austrians, British and Dutch troops aimed to use it as an invasion route to Paris, while the French armies defending that sector aimed to push them back and capture a natural defensive boundary that would protect France in the north while forcing the Allies to make peace.

=== The 1794 campaign ===
The 1794 Flanders campaign had not gone well for the Allies. Despite initial successes in capturing the fort of Landrecies in their centre, they were in turn pushed back on their right flank by General Charles Pichegru's left wing of the Army of the North, which captured Menin, Courtrai and Ypres and fought the battles of Mouscron, Willems, Courtrai, Tourcoing and Tournai. On the Allied left flank, they were also pushed back after repeated attacks across the Sambre by the combined forces of the right wing of the Army of the North, the Army of the Ardennes, and later on the left wing of the Army of the Moselle as well, in the battles of Grand-Reng, Erquelinnes, Gosselies, Lambusart and Fleurus.

On 26 June, the Allied army, then under the command of Prince Josias of Saxe-Coburg-Saalfeld, was defeated in the climactic Battle of Fleurus by Jourdan, who commanded the French forces on the Sambre. After an intense spring full of fighting, Fleurus was the last straw for the morale of the Austrian high command. Already shaky in their resolve to defend Flanders, Austrian diplomats decided to abandon the Low Countries after the battle, and began to plan for a retreat to the Meuse to exit the theatre to the east.

This Austrian strategic decision created serious division in the Allied ranks, as the Austrian, Dutch and British forces had very different strategic priorities and lines of retreat from the start. While the Austrian priority was to ultimately defend the Rhine and Germany in the east, the British and Dutch priority was to defend the Netherlands to the north. This ultimately led to the Austrian and Anglo-Dutch contingents going their separate ways.

=== Coburg's retreat to the Meuse ===
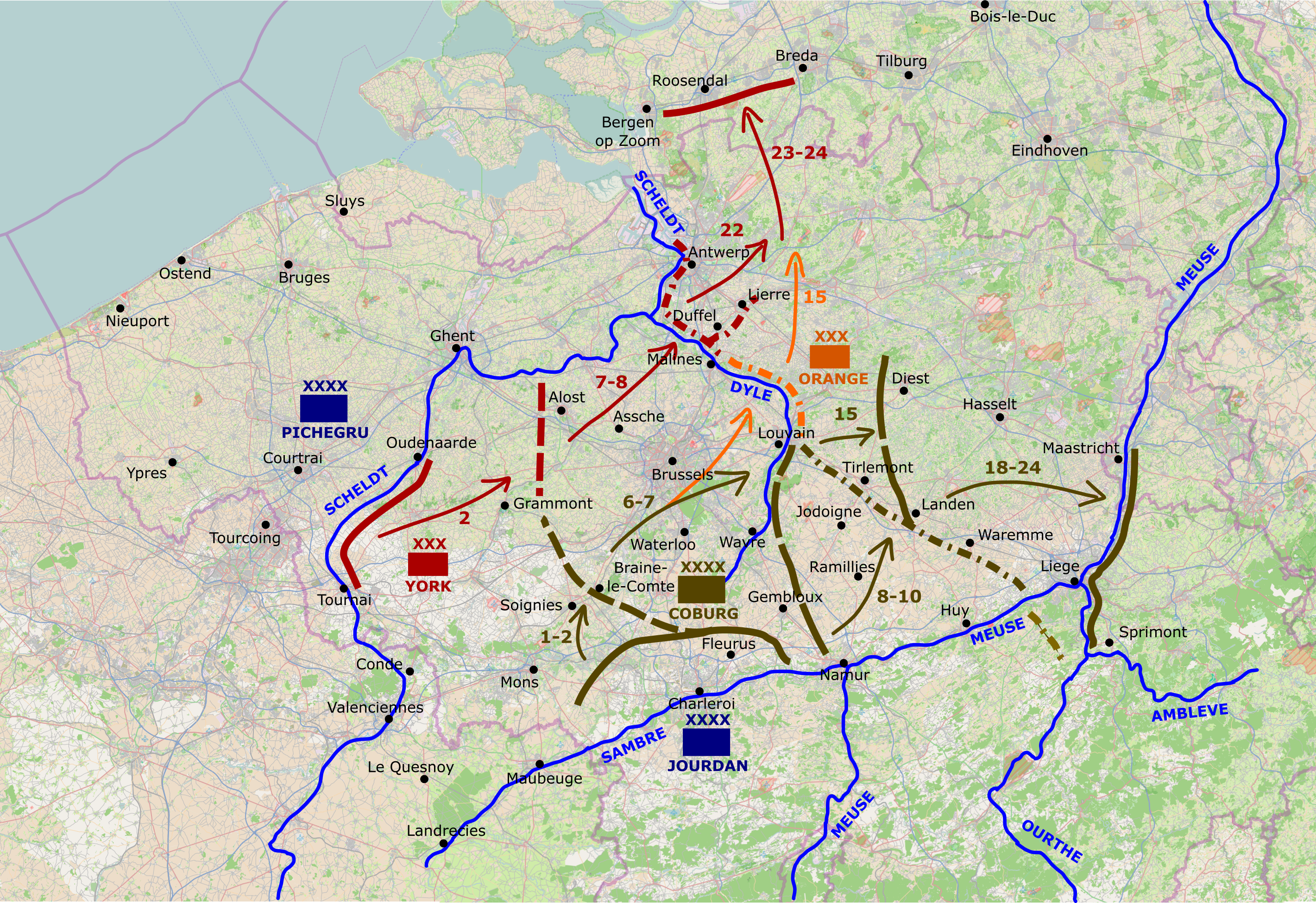
Map showing the retreat and various defensive positions taken by the different components of the Allied army after the battle of Fleurus, together with the dates in July that successive retreats were conducted. Coburg's Austrians are in dark brown.

After Fleurus, Jourdan's forces at Charleroi, most of which were still nominally under the command of Pichegru, were officially constituted as the Army of Sambre-and-Meuse on 29 June by the Committee of Public Safety which then governed France, and placed under the full command of Jourdan. The Army was given the objective of defeating the Austrians where possible, and ultimately to secure the Meuse river, as the minister of war, Lazare Carnot, saw it as the ideal defensible natural boundary on which to anchor France's northern frontier after a peace settlement

However, at the same time, Jourdan was ordered to detach between 30,000 and 40,000 of his approximately 140,000 strong field force under General Barthelemy Schérer to retake the interior fortresses of Landrecies, Le Quesnoy, Valenciennes and Conde, Allied footholds in France which were now isolated by the victory at Fleurus and the Allied withdrawal.

On 1 July, Jourdan commenced his offensive by capturing Mons with his left wing, driving away the Dutch defending the city. This had been the main objective of the attacks on the Sambre throughout the spring of 1794, and its capture cut the direct line of communication between the interior fortresses held by the Austrians, and their main base in Brussels. On 2 July, he advanced it further and captured Soignies, forcing Prince Coburg's right wing back to Braine-le-Comte.

On 6–7 July, Jourdan's centre launched attacks along Coburg's entire line from Braine-le-Comte to Gembloux, which caused Coburg to abandon his plan to defend Brussels, and retreat further eastwards to Malines (modern Mechelen) and Louvain (modern Leuven). From 7 to 8 July, the right wing of the Army of Sambre-and-Meuse attacked Coburg's left wing, which was still anchored on the city of Namur on the Meuse. Forcing it back to Ramillies and isolating Namur, Jourdan then besieged Namur while entering Brussels in triumph alongside Pichegru on the 10th. Fearing Jourdan would advance along the Meuse via Namur and Liege and cut off his retreat, Coburg pulled his centre and left wing back further, to Tirlemont (modern Tienen).

Together with 18,000 men from Pichegru, the rest of whose Army of the North was away besieging Sluys, Jourdan attacked Coburg's line, capturing Louvain on 15 July and Jodoigne either on the 16th or 17th. Meanwhile, Namur, which had been under siege, surrendered on the 19th.

This attack split the Allied army into two operationally separate units for good. Pichegru's capture of Malines on the 15th caused the Dutch army defending that sector to retreat north to defend their home together with the British troops under the Duke of York, while Coburg decided to pull his army east towards the Meuse to defend the Rhine and Germany.

Coburg crossed the Meuse at Maastricht on 24 July, and occupied a defensive line along the east bank.

== Prelude to battle ==
=== Scherer's return ===
After reaching the Rhine, the Army of Sambre-and-Meuse remained on the defensive for most of August, awaiting the return of Scherer's siege corps to reinforce the army and give it enough strength to attack across the Meuse and drive the Austrians away from it.

On the Austrian side, Coburg had resigned as field marshal on 9 August, due to his disagreement with how the war was being run by the leaders in Vienna. He was replaced by Count Clerfayt.

Scherer had spent July and August besieging and recapturing the interior fortresses held by the Austrians. In a decree on 4 July, Scherer had been ordered to execute the garrisons of these fortresses if they did not surrender within 24 hours when summoned to do so. Uncomfortable with these orders, Scherer refused to carry them out, instead permitting the garrison to surrender with full honours if they did so quickly, aware that the garrisons were aware no relief was coming and resistance was futile. The quick surrender of Landrecies on 16 July after 3 days of siege seemed to vindicate his approach.

The siege of Le Quesnoy did not go as quickly. Beginning on 17 July, the fortress only surrendered on 15 August, giving rise to criticism of Scherer's slowness. Valenciennes and Conde then fell in quick succession on the 20 and 30 August, completing Scherer's mission.

With the interior of France purged of enemy presence, Scherer returned to Jourdan, where a celebratory festival was held in the army on 4 September to welcome them.

=== The corps structure of the Army of Sambre-and-Meuse ===
After the battle of Fleurus, the army of Sambre-and-Meuse had been divided into three wings, which were termed corps d’armee, under the command of General Francois Severin Marceau on the right, Jourdan in person in the centre, and General Jean-Baptiste Kléber on the left. Following Scherer's return, he took over command of the Left Wing from Marceau, who returned to command of his own division.

On the eve of the Battle of Sprimont, Kleber's left corps had some 35,000 men, Jourdan had 50,000 men in the centre corps, and Scherer had some 30,000 men in the right corps.

=== Jourdan's ruse ===
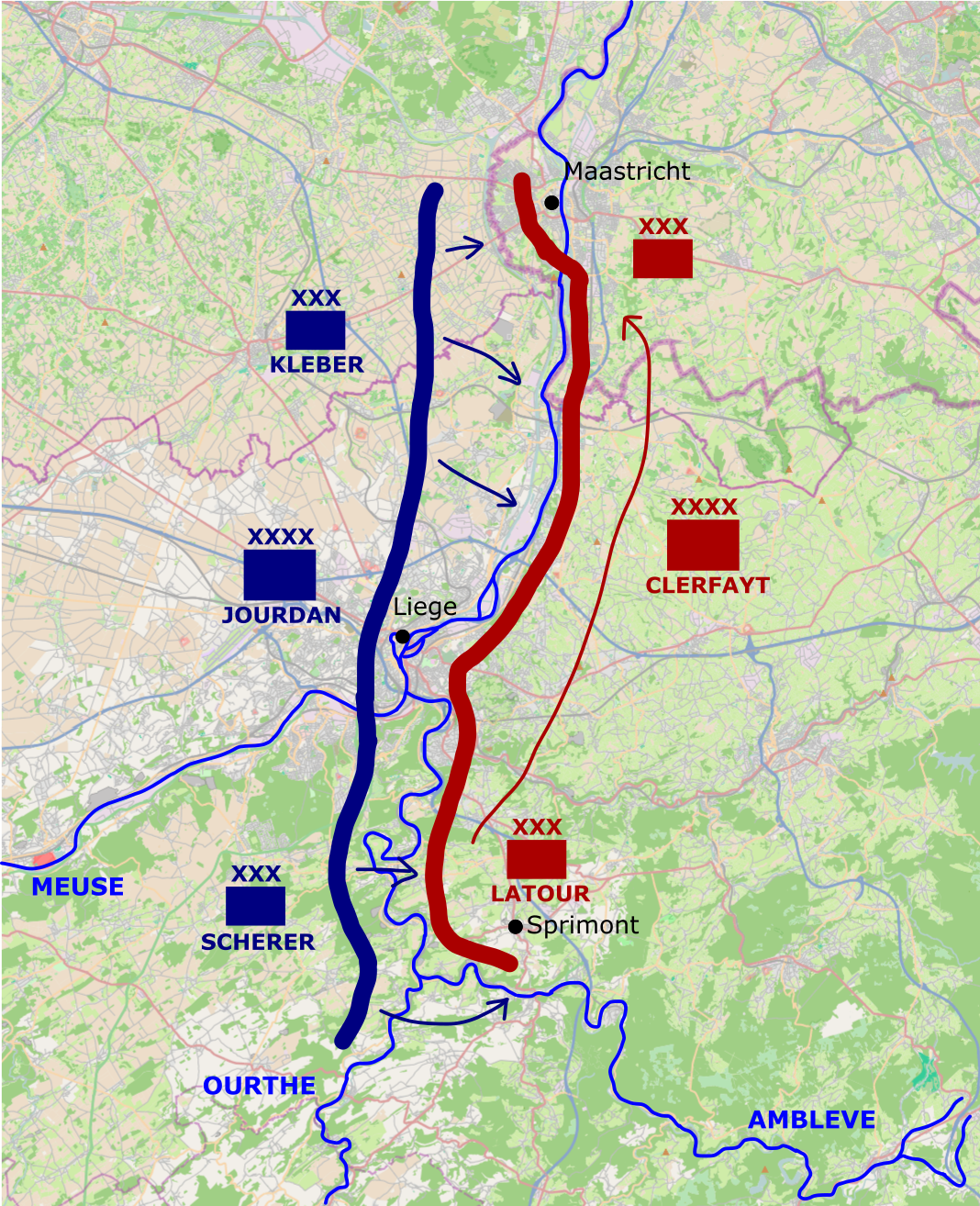
Map showing the approximate positions of the French and Allied armies facing each other across the Meuse and Ourthe. After a diversionary attack on 17 Sep convinces Clerfayt that Jourdan will attack his right, he weakens his left flank to strengthen the other wing, with fateful consequences as Jourdan attacks it the next day..

Jourdan had been ordered by the Committee of Public Safety on 22 August to cross at Liège and secure the eastern bank of the river Meuse. However, with Clerfayt disposed along that bank from Maastricht to Sprimont on the Ourthe river, it would be very difficult to cross such a wide river with an army, especially in the face of strong resistance, since Liège was in the centre of Clerfayt's line.

Jourdan saw the opportunity to accomplish his mission by turning the Allied left flank with his right wing, which was already across the Meuse. To maximise his chances of success, he ordered Kleber to launch a diversionary attack on Clerfayt's right and centre around Maastricht on 17 September.

Clerfayt was tricked by this attack into thinking the main threat lay in that direction, and pulled thousands of troops from his left wing to reinforce his right. The very next day, Jourdan attacked the now-weakened left wing.

== Battle ==
The battle of Sprimont, 18 September 1794. Latour's left wing of the Austrian army is outflanked and forced to retreat by superior numbers, compromising Clerfayt's entire Austrian line of the Rhine.

Clerfayt's left wing was commanded by Theodor Franz, Count Baillet von Latour. Now left with only about 25,000 men, Latour occupied positions between Sprimont and Esneux. Misestimating that the French forces in his front numbered less than 30,000 men, Latour wrote to Clerfayt that he remained "full of confidence in the excellence of my position" despite the evidence of French activity.

However, Jourdan had actually amassed some 40,000 men, most of which comprised his entire Right Wing corps, against Latour, and he planned to launch four division-sized attacks across both the Ourthe and its subsidiary, the Ambleve river. The main attack was to be made by Generals Marceau's, Jean Mayer's and Honore Hacquin's divisions on the Ambleve, which curved around Latour's flank, while the division of Jean Pierre Francois Bonnet (also spelled Bonet) would launch a subsidiary frontal attack on Latour's front at Esneux, and the four divisions were to encircle Latour from two directions.

At 6 am on 18 September, Scherer launched his attack with an opening bombardment, followed by river crossings. Unlike past battles where river crossings were made by massed waves of men rushing across, Scherer's corps adopted a more methodical approach. Skirmishers crossed first to screen and secure the crossing points, before being followed by the main force deployed in disciplined marching columns.

Marceau crossed at Halleux, and eventually overcame the resistance in his front after 2 hours of fighting. Mayer's division had an easy crossing at Aywaille and used the broken terrain in his sector, which gave the attacker cover against a defender's fire, to advance towards Sprimont in open order.

Hacquin's crossing was more strongly contested. With the limited forces of men available to him, Latour was only able to launch one concentrated counterattack, and he had chosen Hacquin's crossing furthest east at Sougnee (modern Sougné) as its target. This quickly pushed Hacquin back across the Ambleve. Hacquin however quickly marched even further east for a crossing at Nonceveux, from which he was able to get around Latour's extreme left, capture the heights on the opposite bank of the Ambleve and march towards Louveigne to threaten Latour's rear. While this was happening, Bonnet had crossed at Esneux, and with Latour fully occupied on the Ambleve, this was the final straw. Threatened from multiple directions, in danger of encirclement and with no reserves left to counterattack, Latour ordered a withdrawal towards Clerfayt's main body.

== Aftermath ==
Latour's retreat compromised Clerfayt's entire position on the Meuse as his left flank was now exposed and unprotected. As Jourdan had expected, this led Clerfayt to order a general retreat from the Meuse, permitting Jourdan to cross unopposed at Liege as planned. Leaving 15,000 men under General Duhesme to besiege Maastricht, now isolated by Clerfayt's retreat, Jourdan crossed the Meuse with the rest of the army in pursuit of Clerfayt, who had retreated completely out of Flanders and withdrawn to the Roer river in Germany.

Jourdan would storm Clerfayt's Roer defences at the Battle of Aldenhoven on 2 October.

== Bibliography ==
- Thiry, Louis (1936). La Bataille de Sprimont (in French). Falk fils ed. Archived from the original on 20 September 2019.
