= Jean-Étienne Championnet =

French Army officer (1762–1800)

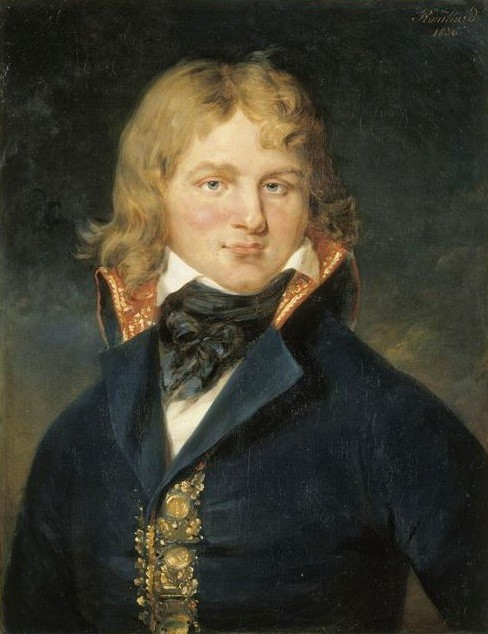
- General Jean-Étienne Championnet
- Born: 13 April 1762; Alixan, France
- Died: 9 January 1800 (aged 37) Antibes, Alpes-Maritimes
- Allegiance: France
- Branch: Infantry
- Service years: 1789–1800
- Rank: General of Division
- Conflicts: War of the First Coalition; Second Battle of Wissembourg; Battle of Arlon; Battle of Lambusart; Battle of Fleurus; Battle of Sprimont; Battle of Aldenhoven; Rhine Campaign of 1795; Rhine Campaign of 1796; War of the Second Coalition; Battle of Civita Castellana; Battle of Genola

Jean-Étienne Vachier Championnet (English: /ˈʃæmpiəneɪ/ SHAM-pee-uh-NAY, French pronunciation: [ʒɑ̃ etjɛn vaʃje ʃɑ̃pjɔnɛ]; 13 April 1762 – 9 January 1800) was a French Army officer who led a Republican French division in several important battles of the French Revolutionary Wars. He became commander-in-chief of the Army of Rome in 1798 and of the Army of Italy in 1799. He died in early 1800 of typhus. His name is one of the names inscribed on the Arc de Triomphe, on Column 3.

== Career ==
Championnet joined the French Army at an early age and served in the Great Siege of Gibraltar. During the French Revolution, he took a prominent part in the movement and was elected by the men of a battalion to command them. In May 1793 he was charged with the suppression of the civil disturbances in the Jura, which he quelled without bloodshed. Under Charles Pichegru he took part in the Rhine campaign of 1793 as a brigade commander, and at Weissenburg and in the Palatinate won the commendation of Lazare Hoche.

At Fleurus his stubborn fighting in the centre of the field contributed greatly to Jourdan's victory. In the subsequent campaigns he commanded the left wing ‘of the French armies on the Rhine between Neuwied and Düsseldorf, and took a part in expeditions to the Lahn and the Main rivers. At the conclusion of the Rhine Campaign of 1796, he briefly commanded the Army of Sambre and Meuse from 24 January–31 January 1797.

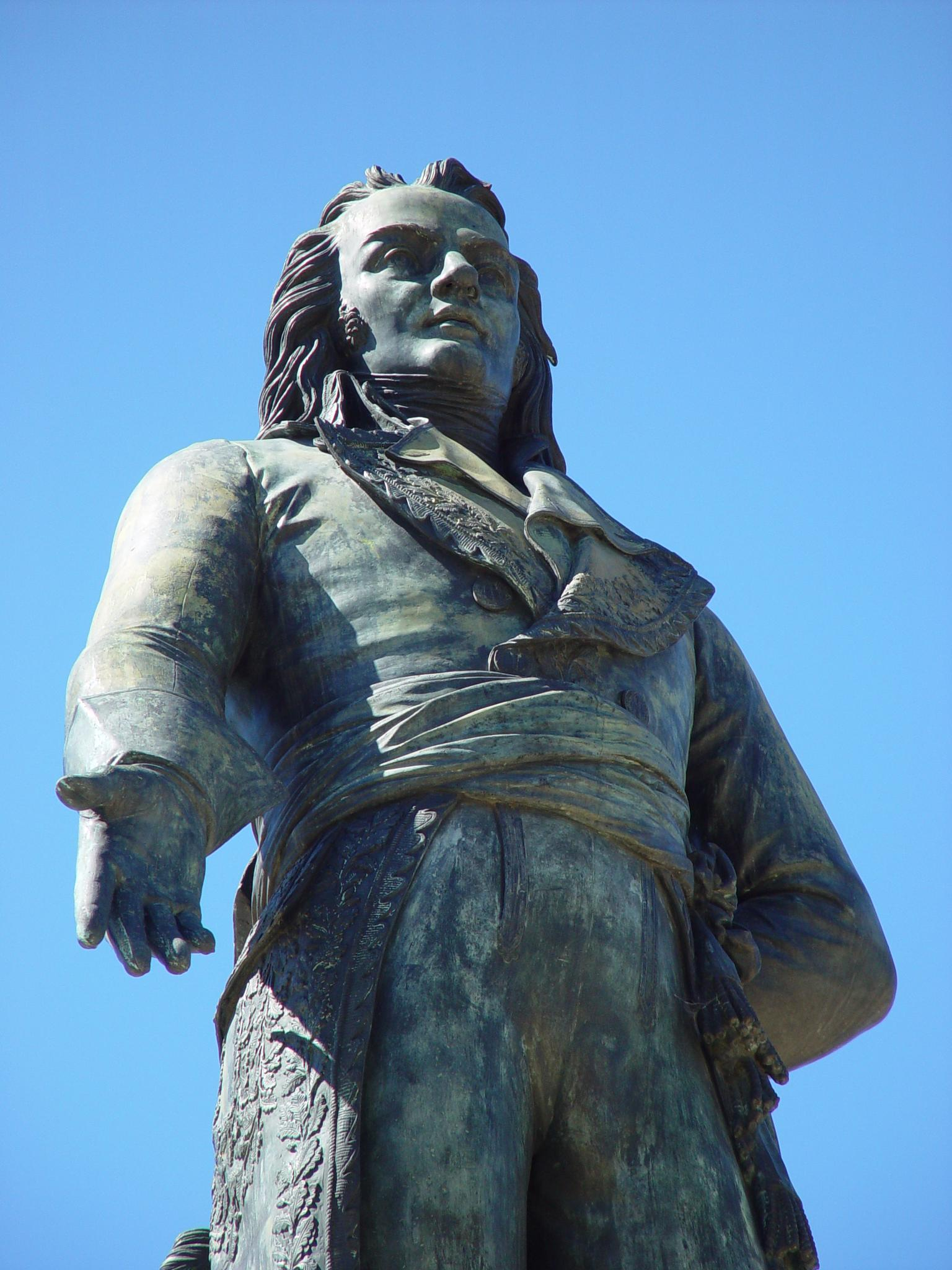
Statue of general Championnet in Valence

In 1798 Championnet was named commander-in-chief of the Army of Rome which was tasked with protecting the Roman Republic against attacks by the Kingdom of Naples and the Royal Navy. Nominally 32,000 strong, the army scarcely numbered 8000 effectives, with a bare fifteen cartridges per man. Leading the Neapolitan army, the Austrian general Karl Mack von Leiberich had a tenfold superiority in numbers, but Championnet held his own and captured Naples itself, and there established the Parthenopaean Republic. His intense earnestness and intolerance of opposition, plus his penchant for looting and an unwillingness to curb atrocities by his troops, soon embroiled him with the civil population. He became involved in a quarrel with Guillaume-Charles Faipoult, one of the "Representatives on mission" (political commissar), was relieved with the accusation of graft, and subsequently imprisoned for a short time.

The following year, however, saw him again in the field as commander-in-chief of the Army of the Alps. This, too, was at first a mere paper force, but after three months' hard work it was able to take the field. After Barthélemy Catherine Joubert was killed at the Battle of Novi, Championnet assumed control over the Army of Italy. The campaign which followed was uniformly unsuccessful and, worn out by the unequal struggle, Championnet died at Antibes in the French Maritime Alps. In 1848 a statue was erected in his honour at Valence.

According to Napoleon, Championette "was brave, full of zeal, active, devoted to his country; he was a good General of Division, an indifferent Commander-in-Chief."

The figure of General Championnet is linked to the traditional carnival of Frosinone, which had been part of the short-lived Parthenopaean Republic, during which a puppet representing the general is carried around the streets of the city and then given to the flames.
