= Battle of Lambusart =

Battle of the War of the First Coalition

Coordinates: 50°27′17″N 4°33′12″E

- Part of War of the First Coalition
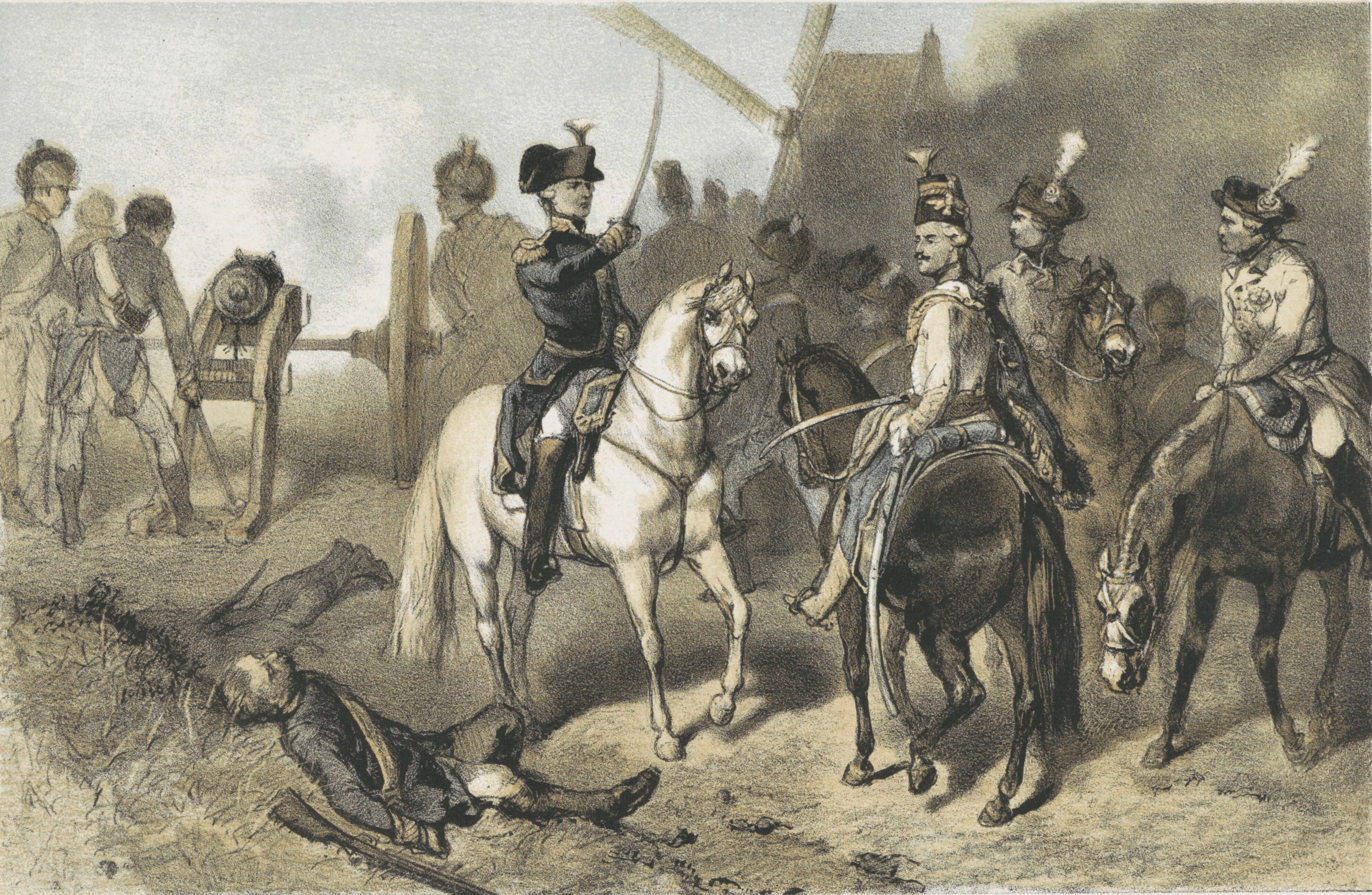
- The Prince of Orange at the Battle of Lambusart
Date	16 June 1794
Location	Charleroi, Belgium
Result	Austro-Dutch victory

Belligerents
Dutch Republic (Habsburg monarchy) Habsburg Austria	Republican France

Commanders and leaders
(Dutch Republic) Prince of Orange	(France) Jean-Baptiste Jourdan

Strength
37,600	70,000

Casualties and losses
2,200–3,000	2,000–4,000

The Battle of Lambusart (16 June 1794) saw a Republican French army led by Jean Baptiste Jourdan try to cross the Sambre River against a combined Dutch and Habsburg Austrian army under William VI, Hereditary Prince of Orange. This battle was the culmination of the fourth of five attempts to consolidate a foothold on the north side of the Sambre. The clash occurred during the War of the First Coalition, part of a wider struggle known as the Wars of the French Revolution. In 1794, Lambusart was an independent village, but it is now part of the Fleurus municipality. Lambusart is located about 10 kilometres (6 mi) northeast of Charleroi.

Three times during the spring of 1794, the French armies attempted to cross the Sambre in the face of resistance by First Coalition forces. After three defeats, they were reinforced by four divisions from the Army of the Moselle under General Jourdan on 4 June, who then took command and led the combined forces to cross the Sambre for the fourth time, and lay siege to Charleroi for the second time, on 12 June. On the 16th, the Prince of Orange counter-attacked and broke the French right flank, forcing Jourdan to lift the siege and withdraw south of the Sambre.

== Background ==
=== Situation in the low countries ===
During the 1794 campaign season of the War of the French Coalition, the focus of operations was in northeast France, as the French armies aimed to drive the Austrian, Dutch and British forces of the Allies, under Prince Josias of Saxe-Coburg-Saalfeld, out of Low Countries and push France's borders to the Rhine river.

The overall commander of the two main French armies on this front, the predominant Army of the North, and the Army of the Ardennes, was General Jean-Charles Pichegru. For the campaign season of 1794, Pichegru had planned to launch his main attacks against the main Allied army under Prince Coburg on both flanks.

While the attacks of the French left wing were largely successful in defeating or at least containing the Allies in the battles of Mouscron (26–30 April), Courtrai (10–12 May), Tourcoing (17–18 May), and Tournai (22 May), the attacks of the French right wing, which required it to cross the Sambre and capture a fortified city as a base that would allow it to remain on the north bank, were less so.

=== Past defeats on the Sambre ===
To date, the French attack forces on the Sambre, comprising the right wing of the Army of the North and the entire Army of the Ardennes under the overall command of General Desjardins, had attacked across the river three times, and had been defeated and forced to retreat back to the south bank three times, at Grandreng (13 May), Erquelinnes (20–24 May) and Gosselies (3 June).

While the initial French objective on the right flank was Mons, after the first two defeats, the commanders of the French force decided to switch their objective to capturing Charleroi instead, as a potentially easier target that could serve as a fortified supply base. However, they were defeated and the siege lifted at the battle of Gosselies. Thankfully, at this time, they were reinforced by four divisions under General Jean-Baptiste Jourdan from the Army of the Moselle, which enabled them to take the offensive again.

== Jourdan's march to the Sambre ==
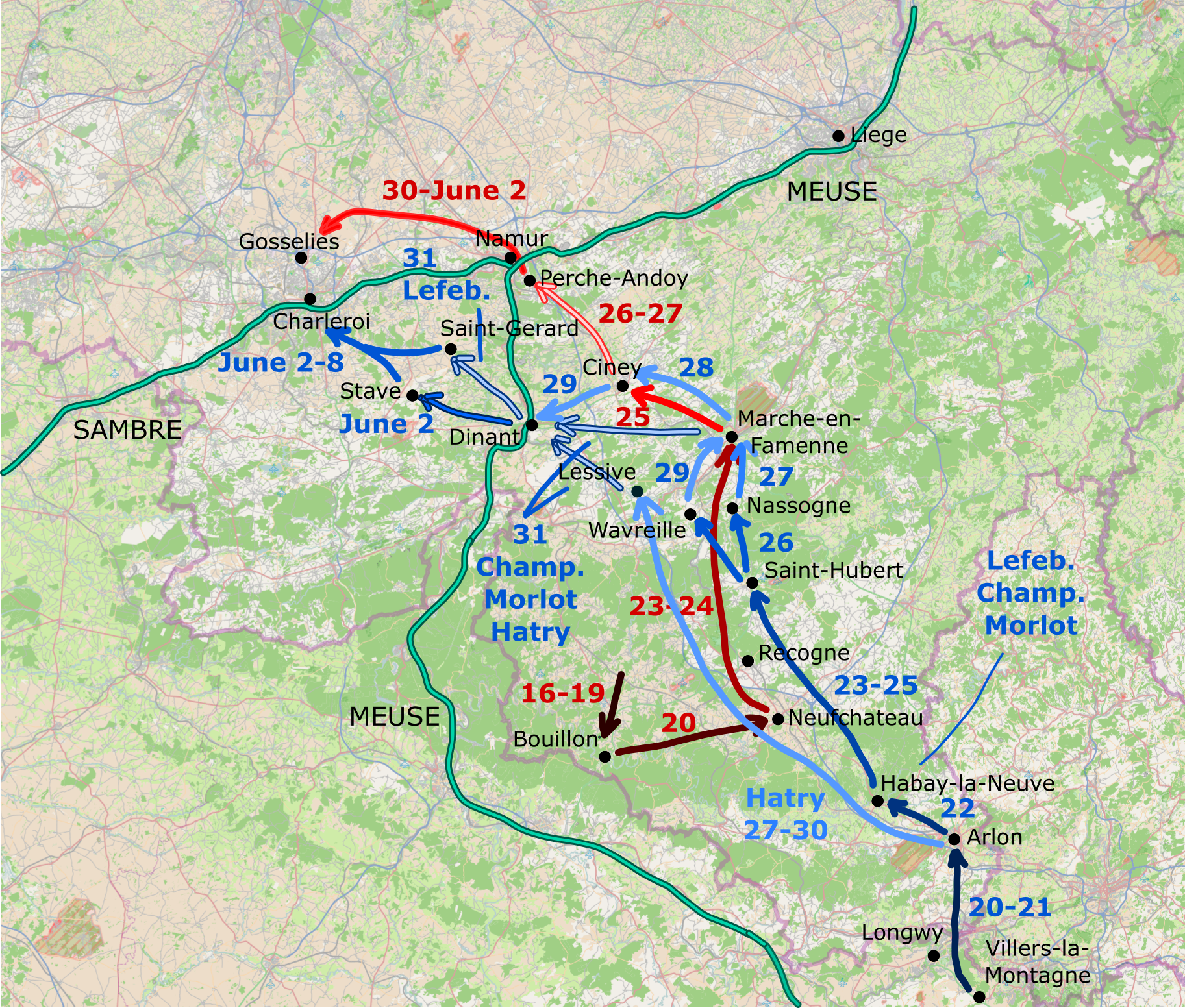
Map showing Jourdan's and Beaulieu's marches to Charleroi, May–June 1794. French forces are in blue, and Allied forces are in red. Numbers refer to the dates in May (unless mentioned to be June) that the marches denoted by the corresponding arrows were carried out. Modern national borders are marked in purple. France is in the lower left, Luxembourg in the lower right, and the rest belongs to the eastern half of Belgium.

Whereas the Army of the North and Army of the Ardennes were in charge of operations in what is today western and central Belgium, the Army of the Moselle, based at the fortress of Longwy, was responsible for operations further east near the border with Luxembourg. The armies had different strategic objectives.

In the early months of 1794, there was not much action on the eastern part of the front, bordering the Rhine; neither the French nor the Allied armies made any major moves. On 30 April, the Committee of Public Safety that ruled France decided, in agreement with a plan that Jourdan had himself proposed, that the left wing of the Army of the Moselle should take the offensive against Liège to the north, to support Pichegru's offensive and help to expel the Allies from the Low Countries. However, it was meant to remain as part of the Army of the Moselle under Jourdan's command, without either coming under Pichegru's authority, or joining the forces on the Sambre. The centre and right were to maintain the defensive and divert the attention of the Allies from the left wing's offensive.

=== Jourdan's pursuit of Beaulieu: 19–24 May ===
General Jourdan, commanding the Army of the Moselle, had planned to launch his offensive against Liège on 21 May after reinforcing his attack force by transferring some troops from his right. However, on 19 May, he received news that General Johann Beaulieu, leading a division of Austrians, had launched an attack on an exposed force of 4,000 French stationed between Belvaux and Noirfontaine, which had made a fighting withdrawal to Bouillon and called for help from him.

Deciding not to wait for his reinforcements to come up, Jourdan marched with the four divisions he had on hand, under Generals Lefebvre, Championnet, Hatry, and Morlot, against Beaulieu on 20 May. On the same day, Beaulieu, unable to make any headway against the defenders or force their surrender, withdrew towards Neufchateau.

Entering Arlon on 21 May, Jourdan decided to hunt down Beaulieu, whose defeat would leave Jourdan's main objective Liège unprotected, and attack him wherever he was. After leaving Hatry's division in Arlon to maintain communication with Longwy as ordered by the Committee of Public Safety, Jourdan set off with his remaining three divisions for Neufchateau, arriving in Habay-la-Neuve on 22 May

What followed was a pursuit northwards, as Beaulieu withdrew from contact and progressively withdrew from Neufchateau on 23 May to Marche-en-Famenne on 24 May, and eventually all the way back to the heights of Perche-Andoy, just across the Meuse from Namur, maintaining his distance from Jourdan.

=== The capture of Dinant: 25–29 May ===
Chasing Beaulieu, Jourdan reached Saint-Hubert on 25 May, and Wavreille and Nassogne on 26 May, on which day he received new orders from the Committee of Public Safety:

1. Jourdan's objective was changed from capturing Liege to defeating Beaulieu's army and capturing Namur instead
2. Jourdan was to keep General Charbonnier, the commander of the Army of the Ardennes prior to 31 May, informed of his operations in case there was an opportunity for both forces to cooperate against Beaulieu.
3. The bulk of Hatry's division, which had been left to garrison Arlon, was permitted to rejoin and strengthen Jourdan, after considering his protests that the task of maintaining communication with Longwy did not require a full division to carry out.

Jourdan immediately ordered Hatry to leave 6,000 men in Arlon and march the rest to Lessive by 30 May.

Lefebvre, whose division led the way, then entered Marche on 27 May and Ciney on 28 May. On 29 May, Championnet and Morlot, following behind, entered Marche.

Of greater moment was Jourdan's capture of Dinant on the Meuse by his leading elements, also on 29 May. As his supply lines back to Longwy were getting far too long to keep his army supplied, it became imperative to establish a new, shorter supply line. The capture of Dinant would allow Jourdan to be supplied from Givet by the Meuse, instead of overland from Longwy.

During the capture of Longwy, Lefebvre's leading division also drove off Beaulieu's rearguard, which had been stationed on the opposite bank of the Meuse

=== Jourdan ordered to Charleroi: 30 May – 2 June ===
On 30 May, the Committee of Public Safety for the first time ordered Jourdan to reinforce and help General Jacques Desjardin, the commander of the forces on the Sambre, to capture Charleroi, if he was not able to assault and capture Namur out of hand.

On the Allied side, meanwhile, Beaulieu had begun marching from Namur to Sombreffe to join in the eventual attack on Gosselies. All forces in the area were beginning to concentrate on Charleroi for the battle of Gosselies.

With major supply difficulties and the new supply line from Givet and Dinant not yet online, Jourdan's force deteriorated drastically in readiness during this period and only covered 55 km in four days. Indeed, Pierre-Mathurin Gillet, the Representative of the People attached to Jourdan, reported that five soldiers died of starvation during this period.

Advancing towards Charleroi, Lefebvre's vanguard arrived at Saint-Gerard on 31 May, where they made contact with an Allied entrenched camp and halted. On the same day to the rear, Morlot and Hatry crossed at Dinant in the day, while Championnet crossed at night.

Following the evacuation of the entrenched camp on 1 June, Jourdan occupied Saint-Gerard on 2 June, the day of the battle of Gosselies, setting up his headquarters at Stave further beyond. Despite the logistical difficulties, Jourdan was now within operational range of Desjardins' force on the Sambre, though he was too far away on this day to join in the battle of Gosselies.

== Jourdan takes command ==
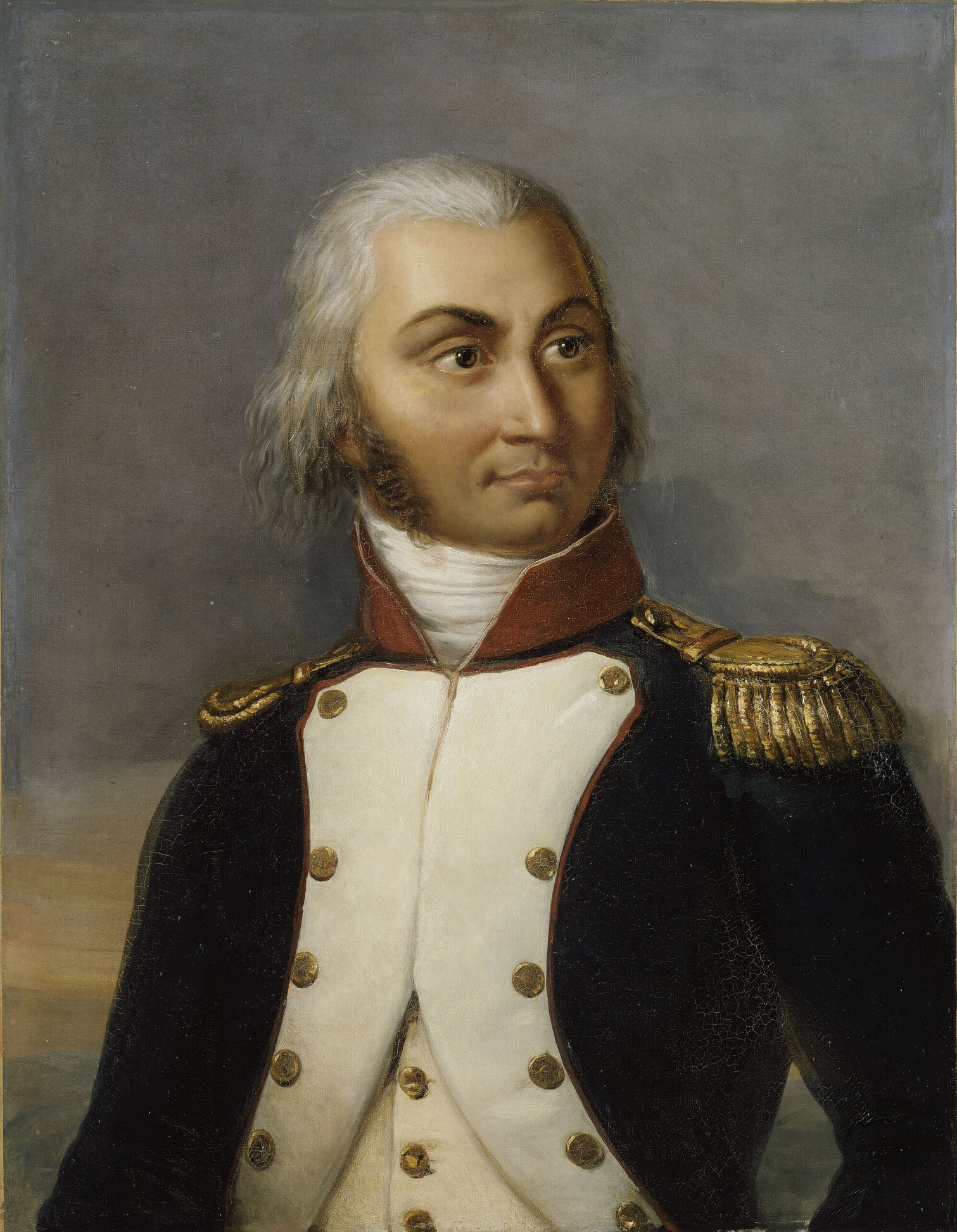
Jean Baptiste Jourdan

Following the battle at Gosselies, the demoralised French army under Desjardin had retreated back across the Sambre, where they were joined by Jourdan's forces in the subsequent days.

On 8 June, taking into account Desjardin's pending request to be relieved of command in favour of a more experienced commander, Jourdan was appointed by the Committee of Public Safety to overall command of the nearly 90,000 men now on the Sambre, the future Army of Sambre and Meuse (which was only formally constituted as such on 29 June).

While Jourdan took command, the Representatives of the People attached to these armies exerted themselves to improve supplies and morale by using their authority, which came from the ruling Committee of Public Safety, to denounce those responsible for poor logistics, and ordering the requisition, by force if necessary, of more transport capacity and supplies from the army's area of operations. This apparently resulted in a material improvement in the supply situation for the armies on the Sambre.

Jourdan planned a fourth crossing of the Sambre and second siege of Charleroi for 12 June.

== The opposing forces ==
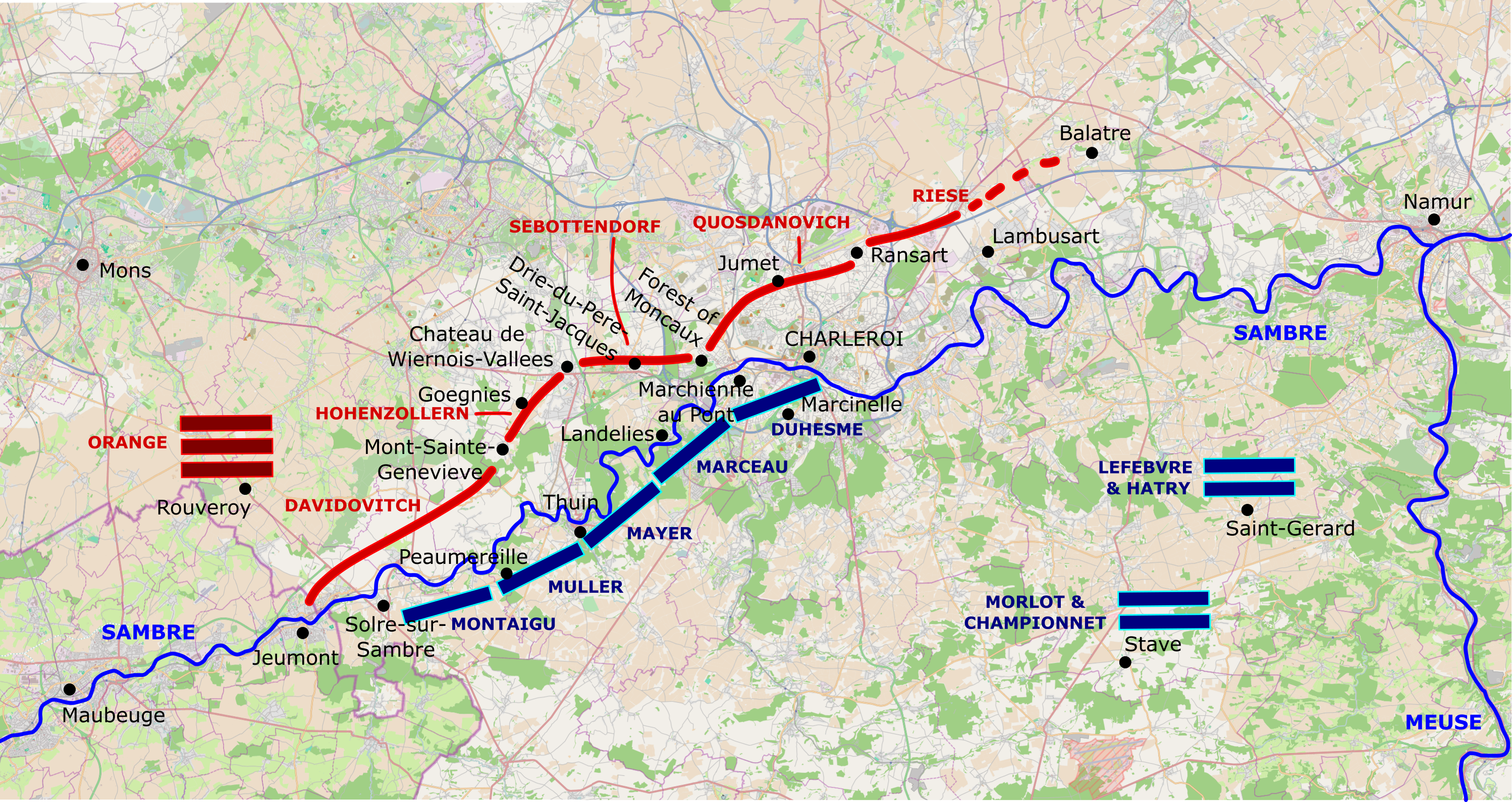
Map showing the positions of the French and Allied troops just before Jourdan took command on 8 June. French divisions are in blue, and Allied forces are in red, showing the main force under Orange and the outpost line stationed to watch the French.

=== French units and their locations after 2 June ===
Divisions of the Army of the North right wing (approximately 26,000 men)

- Duhesme (formerly Fromentin's division)
  - Located between Marcinelle and Marchienne-au-Pont
- Muller
  - Between Thuin and Peaumereille (between modern Valmont and Bois de Villers)
- Montaigu
  - Between Peaumereille and Solre-sur-Sambre

Duhesme and Muller's divisions were placed under the overall command of General Kléber.

Divisions of the Army of the Ardennes (18,738 men)

- Marceau
  - Between Marchienne and Landelies
- Mayer
  - Between Landelies and Thuin

Divisions of the Army of the Moselle left wing (42,411 men)

- Lefebvre
  - At Saint-Gerard
- Hatry
  - At Saint-Gerard
- Morlot
  - On the heights northeast of Stave
- Championnet
  - On the heights northeast of Stave

Cavalry Reserve

- Dubois' division
  - Newly assembled from cavalry forces taken from the various divisions
- Soland's brigade

=== Allied units and their locations ===
The Allies disposed of some 40,000 men, under the Prince of Orange. Orange had in fact sent 4 battalions of troops to reinforce Coburg at Tournai and help raise Pichegru's siege of Ypres, because he thought that the French on the Sambre were neutralised and unable to take the offensive again, while the Allied high command was preoccupied with Ypres and considered it a priority.

Larger attack columns were assembled ad hoc and placed under command of various senior generals as needed.

The main Allied force had withdrawn from Gosselies back to Rouveroy, Orange's main base, on 6 June, in accordance with orders from the Austrian emperor. A strong line of outposts was left running from Jeumont near Erquelinnes to Anderlues, the forest of Moncaux (now Monceau-sur-Sambre), Jumet, Ransart and Balatre, observing French movements against Charleroi.

From west to east, these were under:

- Davidovitch
  - Jeumont to Mont-St-Genevieve
- Hohenzollern
  - Chapelle Charry (intersection of Rue du Planty, Route des Fusilies, Rue Grivegnee north of Mont Sainte Genevieve) to Chateau de Wiernois-Vallee (now Rue du Viernois in Anderlues) via Goegnies (An'swele)
- Sebottendorf
  - Wiernois-Vallee and wood of Moncaux (Modern Monceau-sur-Sambre) via Drie-du-Pere-Saint-Jacques (approximately Place des Perziaux in Fontaine l'Eveque) and Bois de Marche (south of Forchies-la-Marche)
- Quosdanovich
  - From Forest of Moncaux to Ransart via Jumet (modern Saint-Ghislaine)
- Riese
  - From Ransart towards Balatre

== The 2nd Siege of Charleroi ==
=== French plan of attack ===
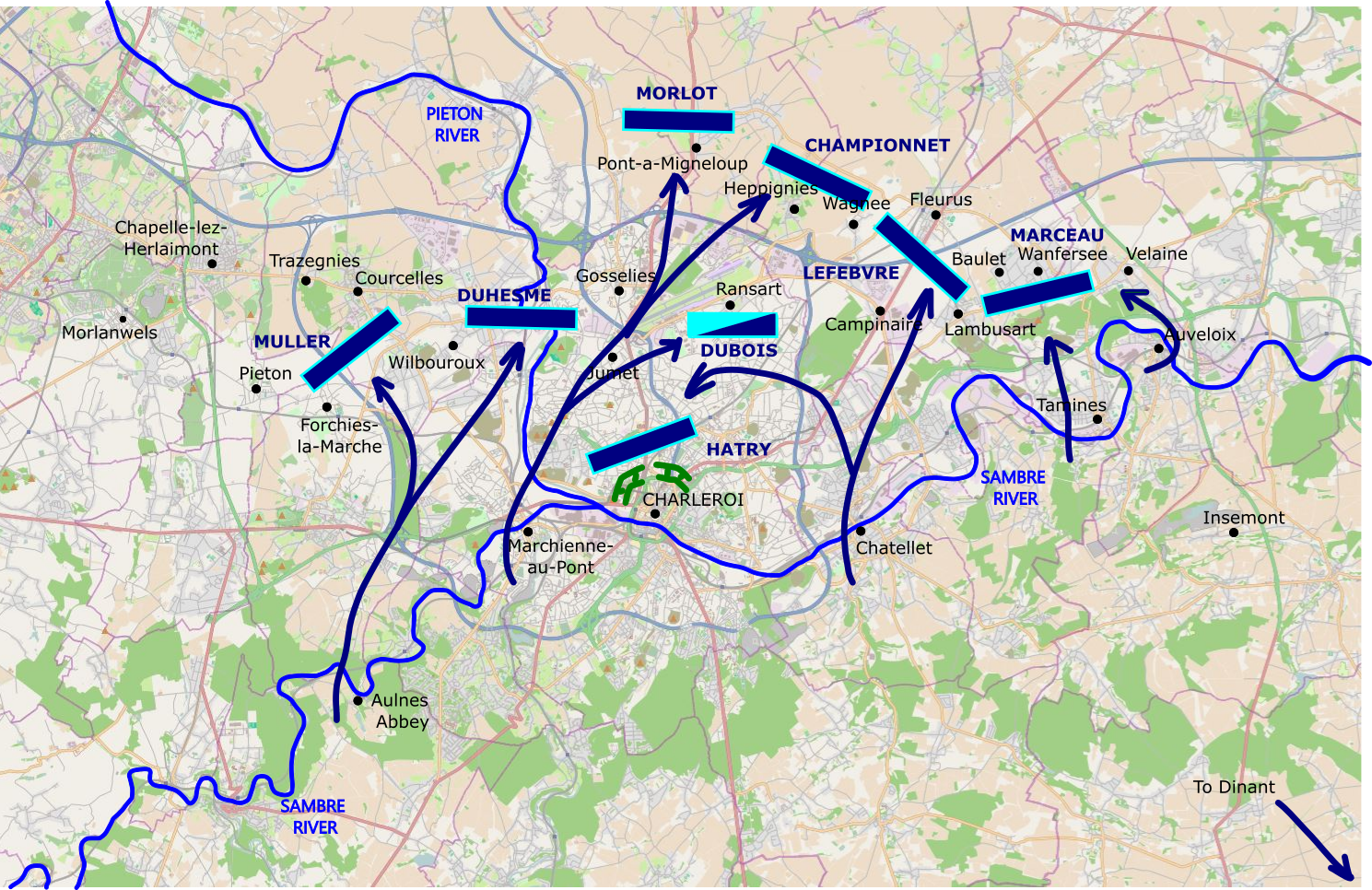
Map showing the crossing points and initial positions taken up by the French divisions under Jourdan during the 4th crossing of the Sambre, prior to the 2nd siege of Charleroi, 12 June 1794

Jourdan's plan of attack was to take the offensive with the divisions of the Armies of the North and Moselle, leaving the Army of the Ardennes to guard his lines of communication and the flank facing Namur. This was partly due to the hostility and outright insubordination of the Army of the Ardennes' general staff, to the extent that the Army's chief of staff took away all their maps and reports of the area so Jourdan could not refer to them.

In total, Jourdan would commit 6,000 men to besieging Charleroi, 55,000 men to cover the siege works and give battle, and 34,000 men to guard the flanks and communication along the right bank of the Sambre.

Before attacking, Jourdan broke up the Army of the Ardennes into detachments that reinforced the garrison of Dinant, occupied Insemont (modern Aisemont), as well as the Sambre crossings at Auveloix (modern Auvelais) and Tamines, east of Charleroi.

=== 12 June: the fourth crossing of the Sambre ===
The French crossed the Sambre on 12 June unopposed, Orange having withdrawn the night before. From west to east, the crossings and initial deployments were as follows:

- Kléber's corps (Aulnes Abbey)
  - Muller's division took position around Forchies la Marche, Trazegnies and Courcelles on the left
  - Duhesme's division took position from Wilbouroux (modern Wilbeau-Roux) to Jumet
- Championnet's, Morlot's and Dubois' divisions (Marchienne au Pont)
  - Championnet took position from Heppignies to Wagnee (modern Wangenies)
  - Morlot took position north of Gosselies at Pont-a-Migneloup (modern Pont-a-Mignetoux)
  - Dubois took position at Ransart
- Hatry's and Lefebvre's divisions (Chatellet)
  - Hatry, assigned to be the besieger, took position at Chatellet preparatory to investing Charleroi
  - Lefebvre took position in an entrenched camp at the Cabaret Campinaire at the crossroads west of Lambusart (the modern roundabout at the intersection of the N568 and the N29)
- Army of the Ardennes (Auveloix and Tamines)
  - Under Marceau, the units that had not been sent to Insemont or Dinant took position covering the French right from Lambusart through Baulet, Wanfersee (now merged into Wanfercee-Baulet) and Velaine (now Velaine-sur-Sambre)

=== 12–13 June: Orange prepares to take the offensive ===
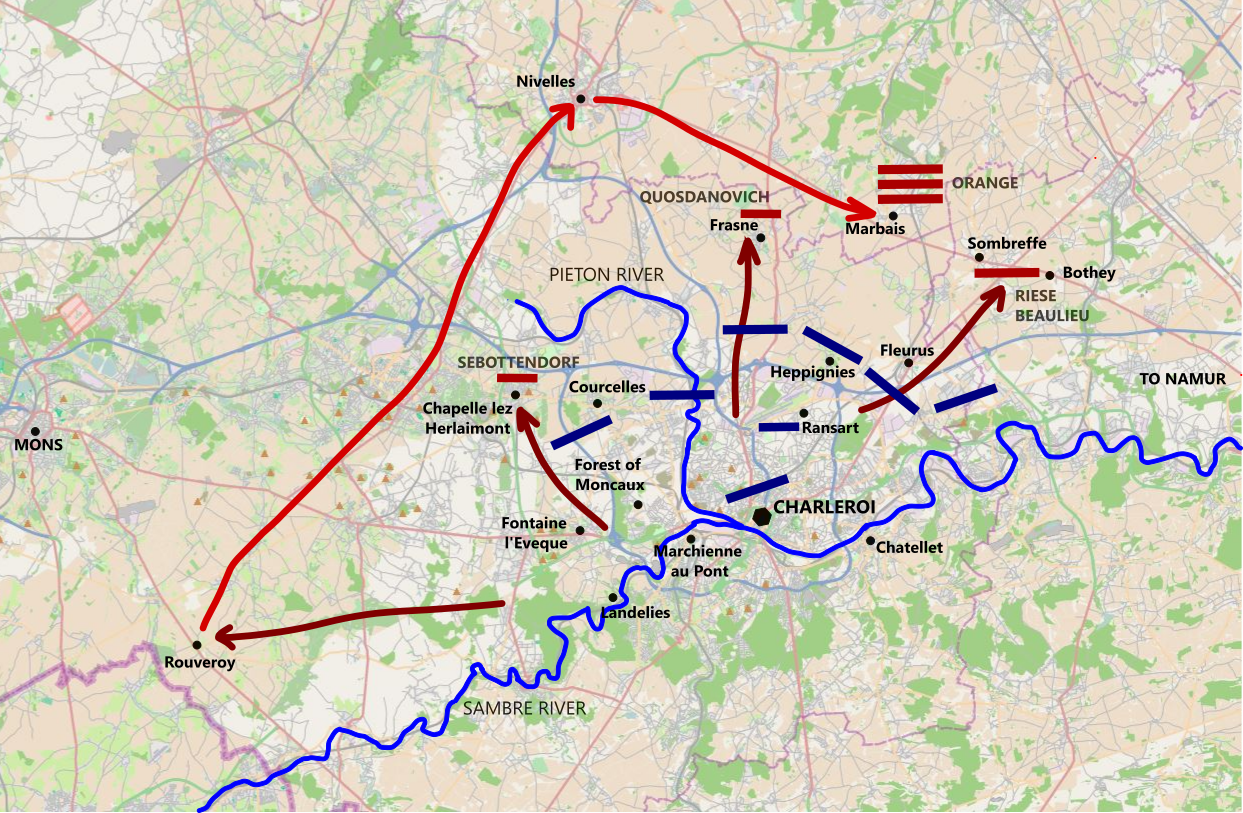
Map showing the initial withdrawals of the Allied outpost line (dark red arrows) and Orange's approach march with the main force to prepare for his counteroffensive. French initial deployments shown in dark blue for context.

After getting news of the imminent French crossing on 11 June, Orange had ordered his outpost line to withdraw from the Sambre.

- Riese to between Sombreffe and Bothey, joined by Beaulieu from Namur where he had returned after the battle of Gosselies
- Quosdanovich to Frasne after reinforcing the Charleroi garrison
- Schottendorf to Chapelle lez Herlaimont
- The rest to Rouveroy to join Orange's main force

Orange had also recalled the four battalions he had despatched to Coburg, and asked Coburg for permission to take the offensive after they had crossed.

Although needing to raise Pichegru's siege of Ypres on the other Allied wing, Coburg agreed to Orange's recall of troops and offensive plans, in the hope that victory would free up more than four battalions of Orange's troops, for use against Pichegru.

Planning to attack from the north and east once again, Orange left Rouveroy on the night of 12 June, marching via Nivelles to reach Marbais with his main force on 14 June.

=== 13–14 June: French investment of Charleroi ===
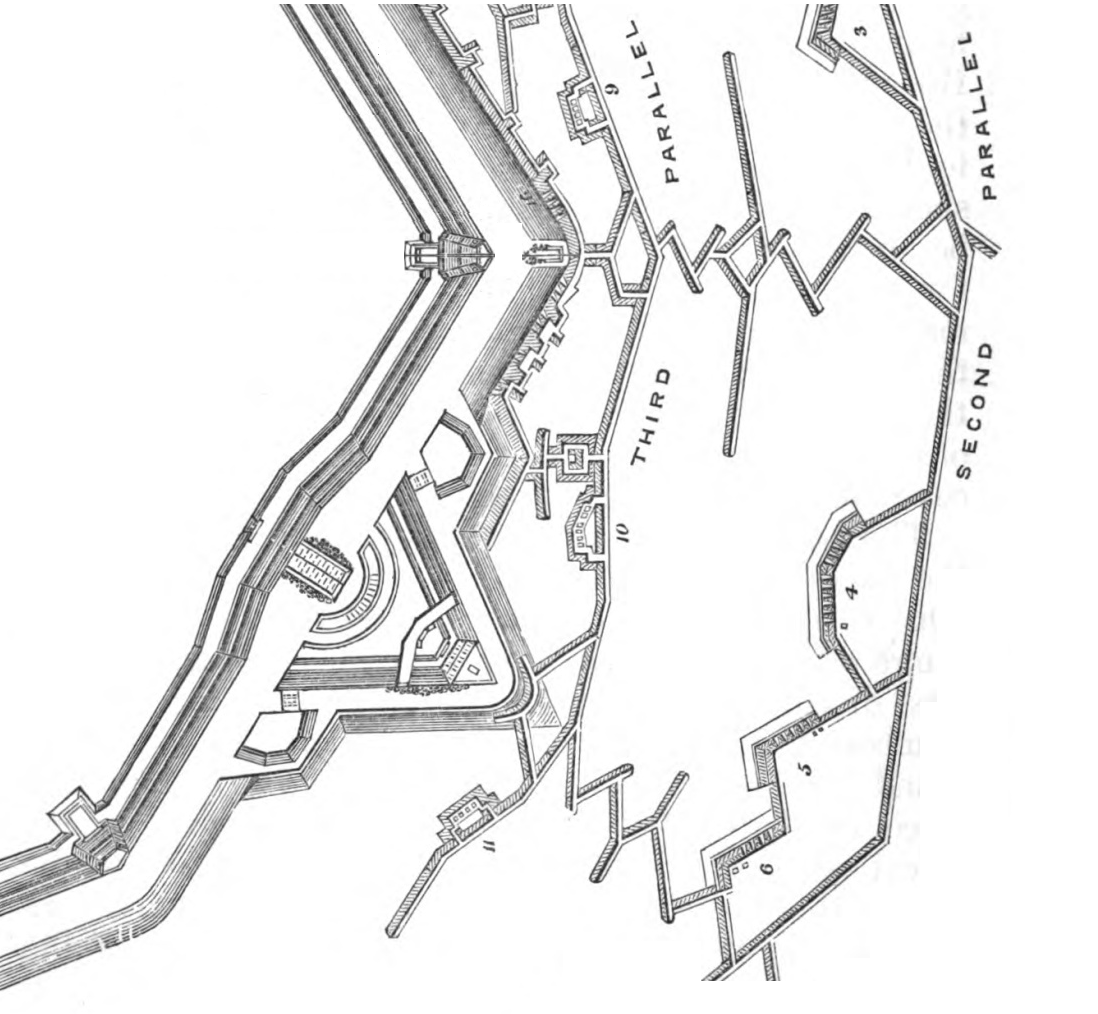
Diagram showing the process of besieging a bastion fortress like Charleroi, showing how three parallels (trenches) would be opened to protect the besiegers, bring artillery progressively closer to the fortress walls, and eventually permit an assault from the third parallel. The first parallel would have been further out behind the second parallel.

Meanwhile, the French recommenced their siege of Charleroi. On 13 June, Hatry's division continued the old siege parallels at Dampremy while beginning a new set of parallels north of Charleroi.

On 13 and 14 June, elements of Hatry's division also operated beyond Gosselies, driving off some Allied outposts and destroying some redoubts and entrenchments, before returning within French lines.

=== 14–15 June: Orange plans his attack ===
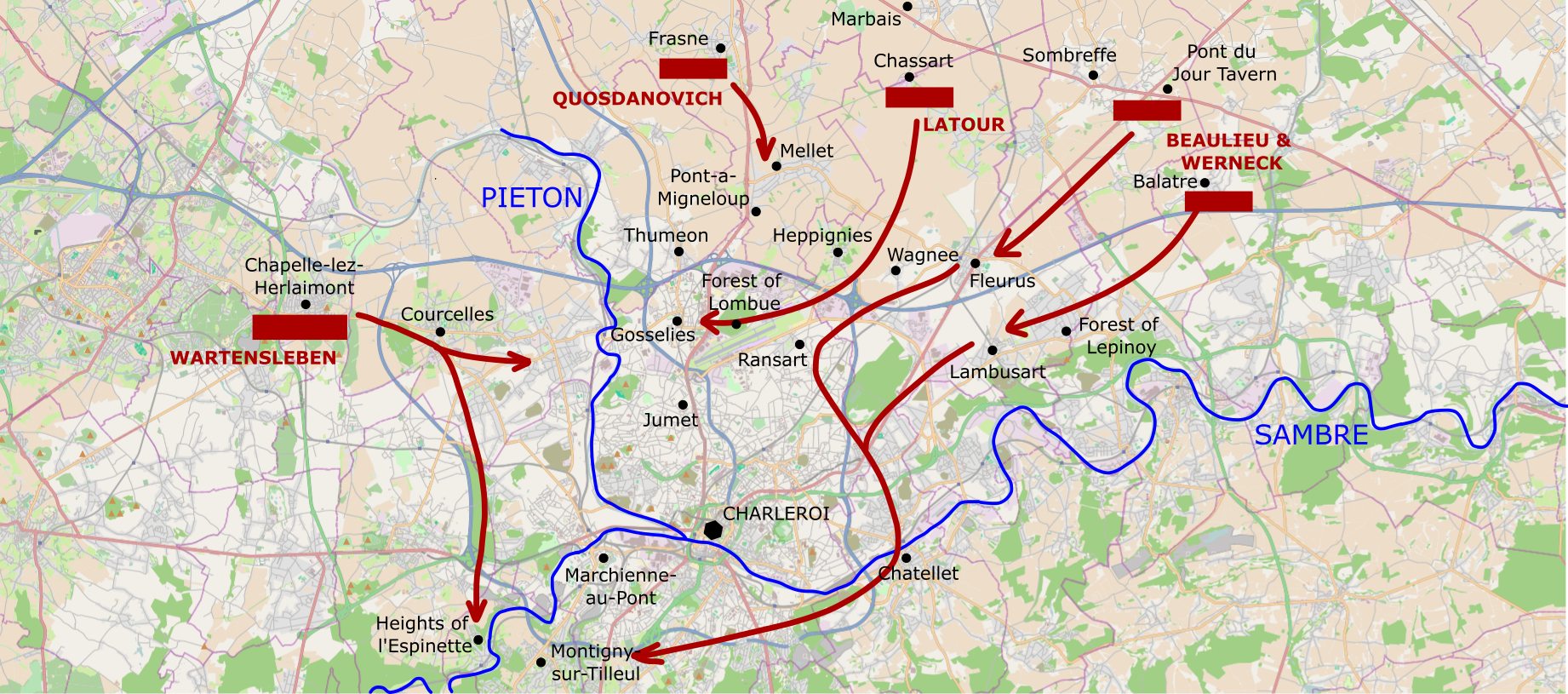
Orange's plan of attack for 16 June

On 14 and 15 June, the French siege works had progressed to the second parallel. Orange scouted the French positions from around Marbais, planning to attack on 16 June. He planned to outflank and hopefully trap the French army by attacking its right wing and rolling it up from the east, forcing it against the Pieton and Sambre rivers while simultaneously cutting off its means of escaping across the river by capturing the bridges and crossings behind them. For this purpose, he divided his army into four columns, which were arranged from west to east as follows:

- Wartensleben's column (9 battalions and 12 squadrons)
  - To take Courcelles and cut off the eventual French route of retreat at Marchienne au Pont by placing cannon on the heights of l'Espinette
- Quosdanovich's column (7 battalions and 12 squadrons)
  - To attack Mellet, demonstrate against Thumeon (modern Thimeon), and wait to capitalise on the success of the attack of Columns 3 and 4
- Latour's column (9 battalions and 16 squadrons)
  - To attack from Chassart towards Heppignies and Wagnee, then towards the forest of Lombue (now Domaine du Bois-Lombut north of Charleroi airport) and Gosselies
- Beaulieu & Werneck's column (14 battalions & 22 squadrons)
  - Half to attack from the cabaret (tavern) of Pont-du-Jour (at the crossroads east of Sombreffe, the modern intersection of the N29 and N93) towards Fleurus
  - Half to attack from Balatre towards Lambusart and the forest of Lepinoy (modern Keumiée)
  - Both to then combine to attack Ransart, capture Chatellet, and head towards Montigny-sur-Tilleul

=== 14–15 June: Jourdan plans his attack ===
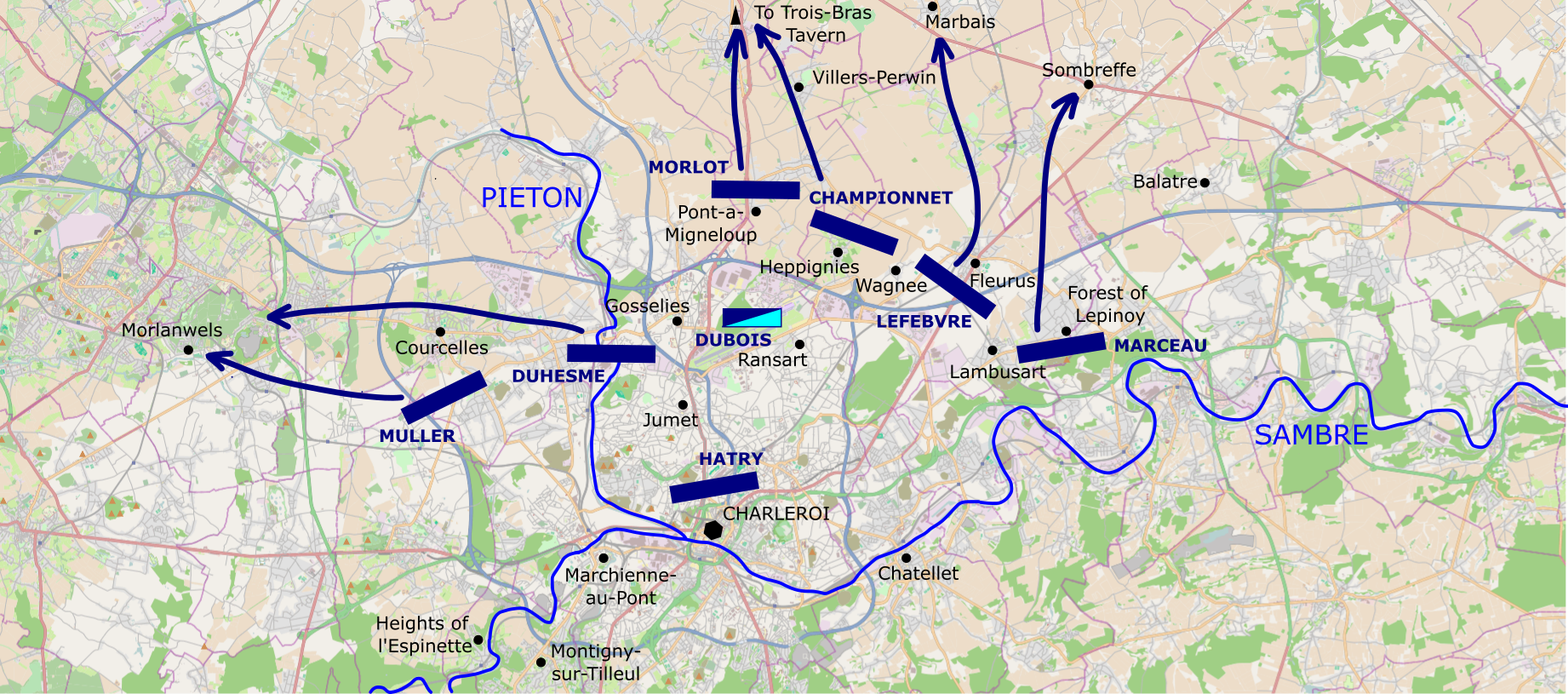
Jourdan's plan of attack for 16 June

Jourdan had become aware of Orange's presence north of his lines, and unbeknown to Orange, the French commander was also planning an attack against the Allied army, also on the 16th, but towards the north and west to drive off the enemy using his superior numbers.

From west to east, the divisions were to attack as follows:

- Kléber's two divisions were to attack from their positions towards Morlanwels (now Morlanwelz) and fight anyone they met along the way, preventing any forces on that wing from joining the main battle on the centre and right
- Morlot and Championnet were to capture the tavern of Trois-Bras (at the crossroads of Quatre-Bras of 1815 fame) via the Brussels road and Villers-Perwin respectively
- Lefebvre was to attack towards Marbais
- Marceau was to attack towards Sombreffe
- The cavalry of Dubois and Soland were to offer support from behind Championnet and Morlot

== The Battle: 16 June ==
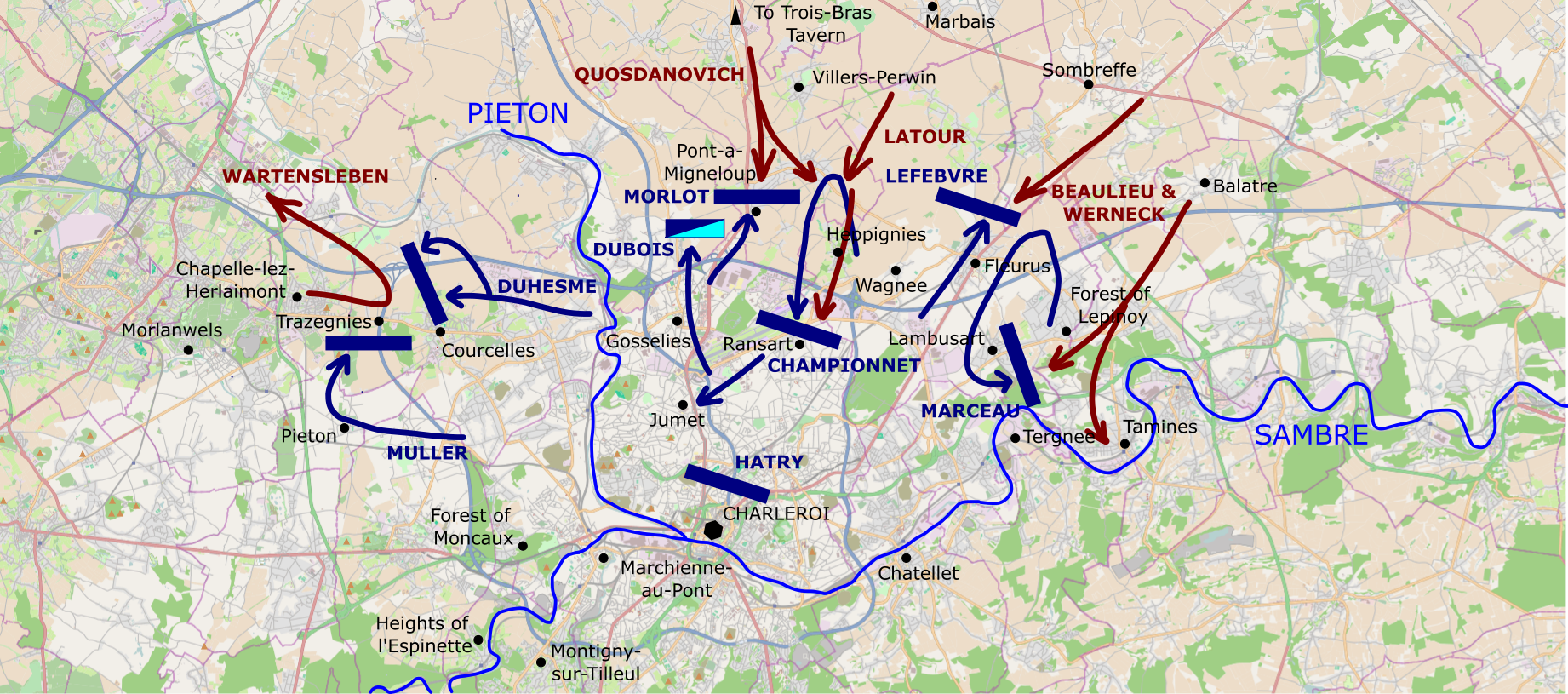
The progress of the battle of Lambusart (16 June) up until 11 am. Kleber's divisions have routed Wartensleben, and Morlot, Lefebvre and Marceau are holding the enemy. Championnet has been outflanked and forced to give ground, opening up a gap in the centre of the French line.

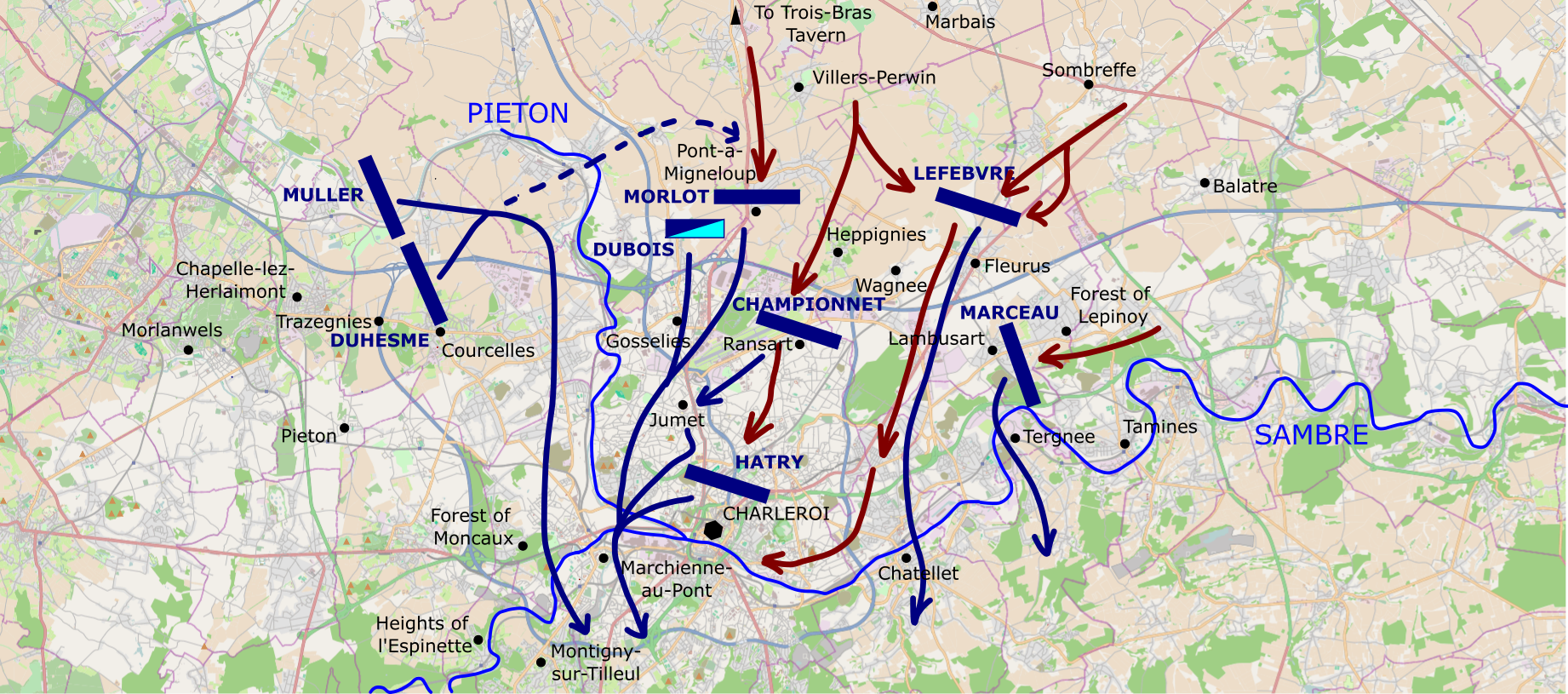
The progress and conclusion of the battle of Lambusart after 11 am. Although Morlot is holding, Championnet's withdrawal exposes Lefebvre to outflanking by Latour, and his division retreats back to the river. Championnet follows suit after running out of ammunition. Jourdan had intended Kleber's divisions to outflank Quosdanovich and roll up the Allied line (dotted line), but with his line cut in two, his centre and right collapsing, and Charleroi relieved by the Allies, he orders a general retreat back across the Sambre to keep his army intact.

With both sides unaware of each other's plans, and the morning of 16 June being foggy, the battle of Lambusart became a series of simultaneous but separate surprise encounter battles between French and Allied attack columns, in which the Allies gradually gained the strategic upper hand.

=== Beaulieu vs Marceau ===
On the French far right, Marceau advanced as far as Fleurus before Beaulieu's attack got into his rear at 5 am, occupying Velaine and heights at the chapel of Sainte-Barbe near Tamines by 7 am. Caught off-balance, Marceau's forces were forced back to Lambusart and the woods along the Sambre there.

=== Beaulieu vs Lefebvre ===
Shortly before the eastern column's contact, at 4.30 am, Beaulieu's western column ran into Lefebvre's advance north of Fleurus. Lefebvre held, even after his right was exposed by Marceau's withdrawal back to Lambusart.

However, at about noon, Lefebvre's left flank was also enfiladed by artillery from Latour's column further west, as it had been exposed by Championnet's withdrawal from Ransart. This was too much and Lefebvre's division broke and retreated towards Chatellet.

=== Latour and Quosdanovich vs Championnet ===
Championnet had advanced as ordered and made contact with Latour's column at St Fiacre. However, Quosdanovich had occupied Mellet as per his orders, and used his position to attack Championnet's left flank while he and Latour were locked in battle.

Quosdanovich's flank attack forced Championnet to withdraw to Heppignies, where he held his position for another 4 hours before being driven back further to Ransart where, running out of ammunition, he chose to retreat back towards Jumet between 11–11.30 am, exposing Lefebvre's left.

Proceeding from Jumet later on in further retreat back to Chatellet, Championnet was attacked by Allied troops from that direction. Fearing correctly that the eastern route of retreat via Chatellet was now cut off (because of Lefebvre's retreat), he turned towards Marchienne-au-Pont instead.

=== Quosdanovich vs Morlot ===
Morlot's division made contact with Quosdanovich's forces just beyond Mignetoux, and occupied and held the town against Quosdanovich's repeated attacks throughout the day until the end of the battle.

=== Wartensleben vs Kleber ===
On the inner left wing, Duhesme's advance ran into Wartensleben's column just before Trazegnies around 6 am, and pinned him down while waiting for Muller's division on the outer left wing to join the attack.

Meanwhile, Muller's division had advanced west past Wartensleben's column and occupied Pieton, putting him in a position on Wartensleben's flank. Muller launched a devastating cavalry flank attack on Wartensleben's right just as Duhesme attacked in front and on the left, routing that Allied column. By 9 am, Kleber had cleared his front of Allied troops.

=== Jourdan retreats ===
Up to about 11 am the French forces had the advantage, being victorious or holding on all fronts. As a result, Jourdan had intended to counterattack using Kleber, who was victorious early, to roll up the Allied right flank the way Orange had intended to roll up the French, with attacking Quosdanovich in front and flank as the first move.

In preparation for this, he ordered Kleber at about 9 am to march towards Pont-a-Mignetoux, while himself marching there with the cavalry reserve, just in time for Dubois' 6th Chasseurs and 10th Cavalry regiments to help Morlot retake the town after being driven momentarily from it.

However, by noon, Jourdan received further updates that Lefebvre had retreated to Chatellet while Championnet was all fought out and also retreating. He also heard that Hatry, whose rear was now exposed by these divisions' withdrawal, had lifted the siege of Charleroi and commenced a withdrawal towards the bridge at Marchienne-au-Pont.

With Kleber too far away to be able to redeploy his forces and march to Pont-a-Mignetoux in time to gain an advantage before his rear was cut off, Jourdan ordered a general retreat at or just before 1 pm to prevent any unnecessary losses.

== Aftermath ==
=== The Allied response ===
Following the order to retreat, Marceau's troops recrossed the Sambre via the bridge at Tergnee (just downriver from Farciennes). Championnet and Hatry recrossed the Sambre at Marchienne-au-Pont to Marcinelle, while Morlot went to Montigny-sur-Tilleul. Kleber returned to the right bank via a bridge at Moncaux, with Duhesme withdrawing along the Pieton river and Muller via Fontaine l'Eveque.

The victory at Lambusart gave both Orange and Coburg the mistaken impression that the Sambre front was finally decisively neutralised, and that the French offensive spirit had been broken, freeing Coburg to focus on relieving Ypres. As a result, Orange was ordered to send the four battalions he had initially recalled once again to Tournai, where Coburg's army was based.

Unfortunately for Coburg, Ypres surrendered just two days later, on 18 June, before he could make any final attempt to relieve it, with or without Orange's troops.

=== The French prepare to retaliate ===
Unfortunately for Coburg and Orange, too, the French army was not really beaten, with only about 2,000–4,000 casualties out of 70,000 men compared to 2,200–3,000 for the 40,000 Allies, and their morale was undented due to the general sentiment among the troops that their repulse was only due to their being surprised and caught off balance both by the fog and a lack of ammunition, without which they would have otherwise been victorious.

Indeed, on 16 June, Jourdan wrote to the Committee of Public Safety:

"I think I can assure you that the enemy has gained no other advantage save the ground [they have captured]. I propose that we shall take our revenge. The representatives of the people Saint-Just, Guyton and Gillet are here; they want me to attack tomorrow. I agree with them; but I think we could do it more advantageously on another point. I will talk to them and do what they think is most beneficial."

Saint-Just was, in fact, livid at this fourth failure, and had been demanding both that heads rolled for the defeat, and that the army should re-cross the Sambre for another battle immediately. However, though he did manage to order the dismissal and arrests of the officers of several smaller units, his broader demands for an immediate rematch were diplomatically deflected by Jourdan, who appeased him with the assurance that the army also wanted to be back for revenge as soon as practicable, and would do so shortly.

This opportunity for revenge would come on 26 June at the battle of Fleurus, which would prove to not only be the culmination of the campaign on the Sambre, but also of the struggle for the Low Countries as a whole.
