= Coutelle =

Coutelle is a surname. Notable people with the surname include:

- Catherine Coutelle (born 1945), French politician
- Jean-Marie-Joseph Coutelle (1748–1835), French engineer, scientist, and ballooning pioneer
