= Observation balloon =

Military crewed balloon

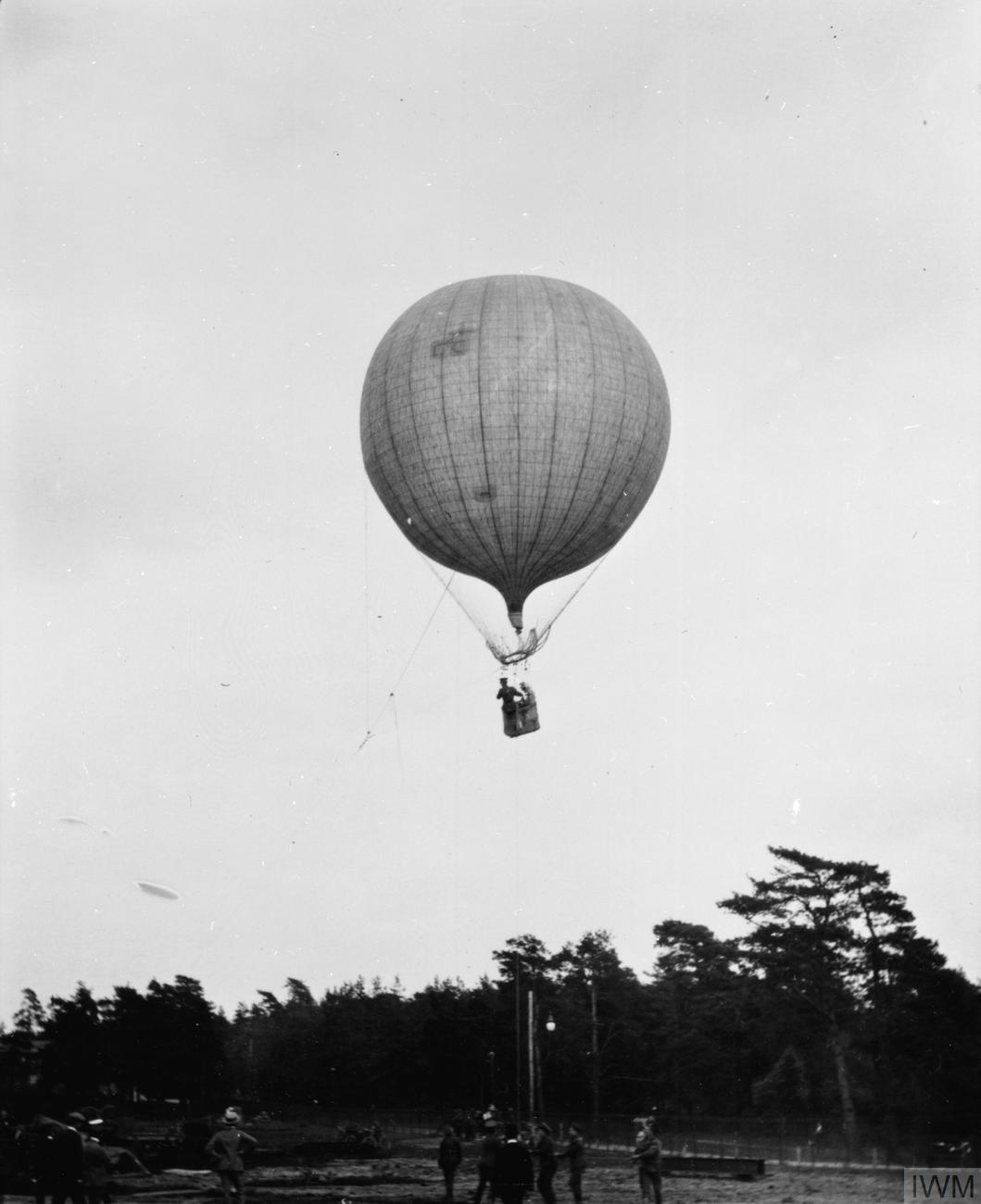
British observation balloon from 1908, typical of pre-WWI observation balloons

An observation balloon is a type of balloon that is employed as an aerial platform for gathering intelligence and spotting artillery. The use of observation balloons began during the French Revolutionary Wars, reaching their zenith during World War I, and they continue in limited use today. Synonyms include espionage balloon, reconnaissance balloon, spy balloon, and surveillance balloon.

Historically, observation balloons were filled with hydrogen. The balloons were fabric envelopes filled with hydrogen gas, the flammable nature of which led to the destruction of hundreds of balloons. Observers manning these observation balloons frequently had to use a parachute to evacuate their balloon when it came under attack. Shortly after World War I, observation balloons were often filled with non-flammable helium to avoid the potentially explosive consequences of hydrogen.

Typically, balloons were tethered to a steel cable attached to a winch that reeled the gas bag to its desired height (usually 1,000-1,500 metres) and retrieved it at the end of an observation session.

== History ==
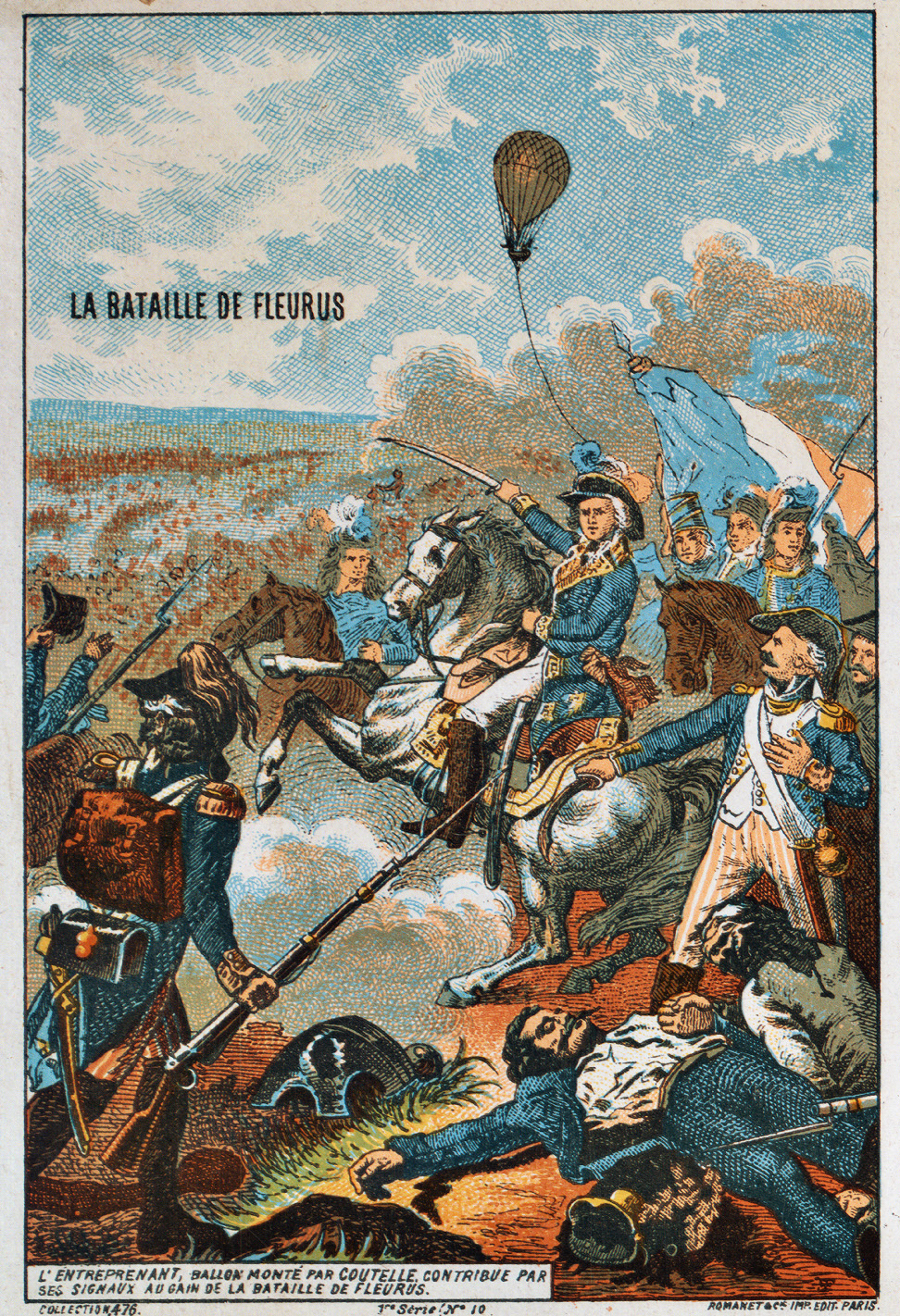
The battle of Fleurus, 26 June 1794, saw the first military use of an aircraft (L'Entreprenant).

The first military use of observation balloons was by the French Aerostatic Corps during the French Revolutionary Wars, the very first time during the Battle of Fleurus (1794). The oldest preserved observation balloon, L'Intrépide, is on display in a Vienna museum. They were also used by both sides during the American Civil War (1861–65) and continued in use during the Franco-Prussian War (1870–71). Balloons were first deployed by the British Army's Royal Engineers during the expeditions to Bechuanaland in 1884 and Suakin in 1885. They were also deployed during the Second Boer War (1899–1902), where they were used in artillery observation at the Battle of Magersfontein and during the Siege of Ladysmith. In South America, a reconnaissance balloon was deployed by Brazil in July 1867 during the Paraguayan War.

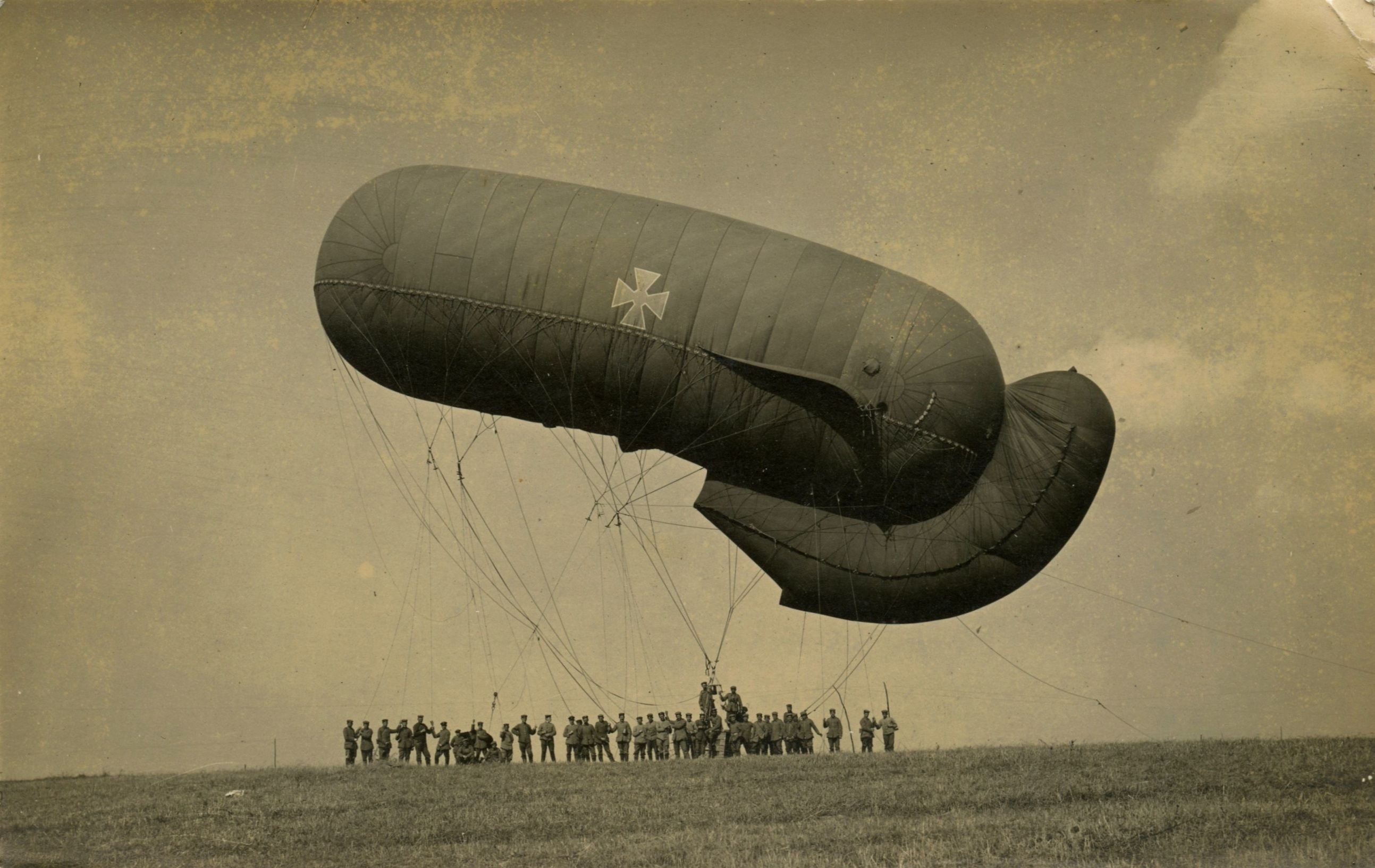
German Parseval-Siegsfeld type balloon at Équancourt (September 1916). The rear "tail" fills with air automatically through an opening facing the wind.

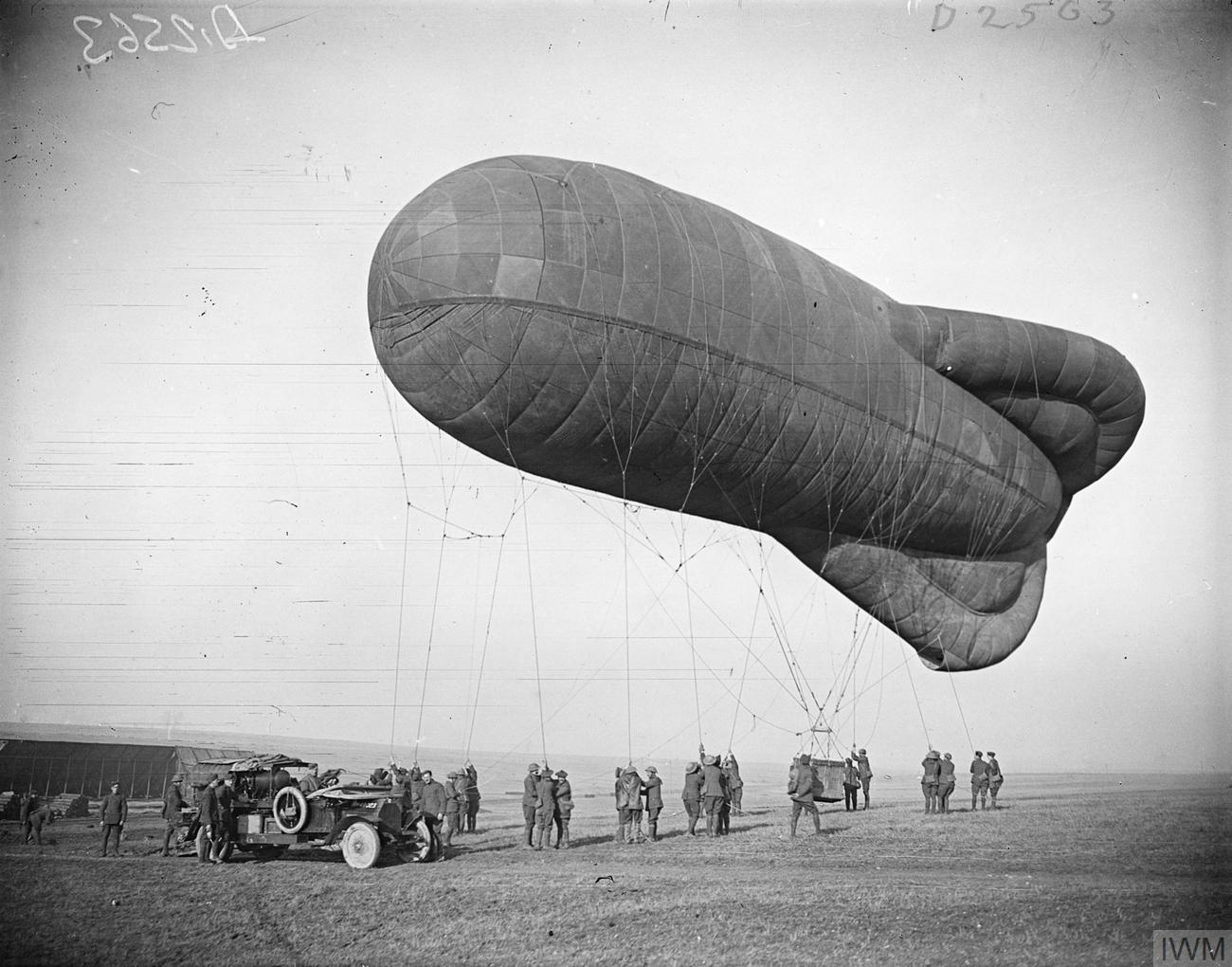
Caquot type kite balloon, used by the Allies in the mid-latter part of WWI

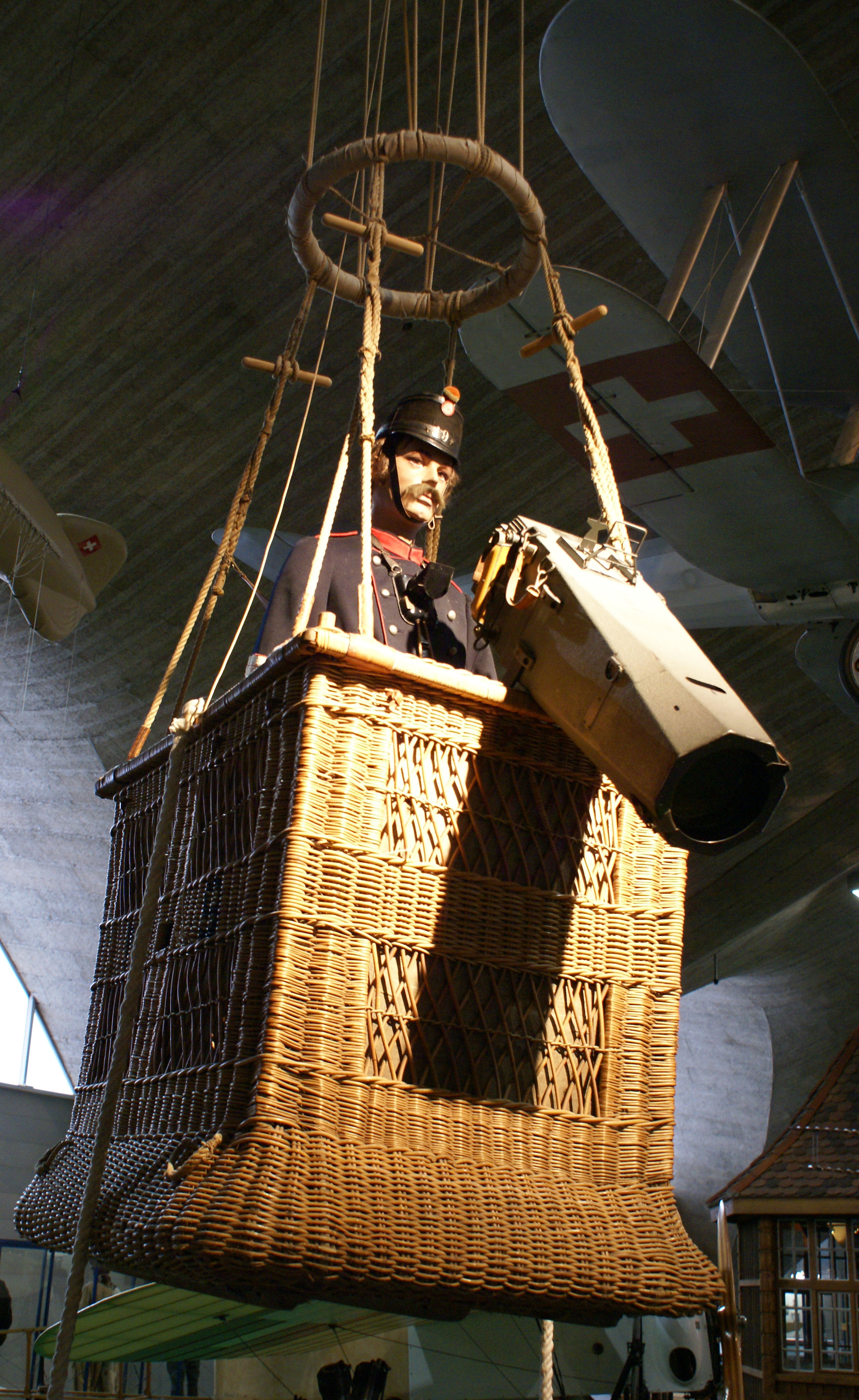
Replica of a balloon observer of the Swiss Army in World War I

World War I was the high point for the military use of observation balloons, which were extensively deployed by both sides. Artillery had developed to the point where it could engage targets beyond a ground-based observer's visual range. Positioning artillery observers on balloons, generally a few miles behind the front lines and at altitude, allowed them to see targets at greater range than they could on the ground. This allowed the artillery to take advantage of its increased range.

Despite their experience in late 1800s Africa, the British were behind developments and were still using spherical balloons. These were quickly replaced by more advanced types, known as kite balloons, which were aerodynamically shaped to be stable and could operate in more extreme weather conditions. The Germans first developed the Parseval-Siegsfeld type balloon, and the French soon responded with the Caquot type.

Because of their importance as observation platforms, balloons were defended by anti-aircraft guns, groups of machine guns for low altitude defence and patrolling fighter aircraft. Attacking a balloon was risky, but some pilots relished the challenge. The most successful were known as balloon busters, including such notables as Belgium's Willy Coppens, Germany's Friedrich Ritter von Röth, America's Frank Luke, and the Frenchmen Léon Bourjade, Michel Coiffard and Maurice Boyau. Many expert balloon busters were careful not to go below 1,000 feet (300 m) to avoid exposure to anti-aircraft and machine guns.

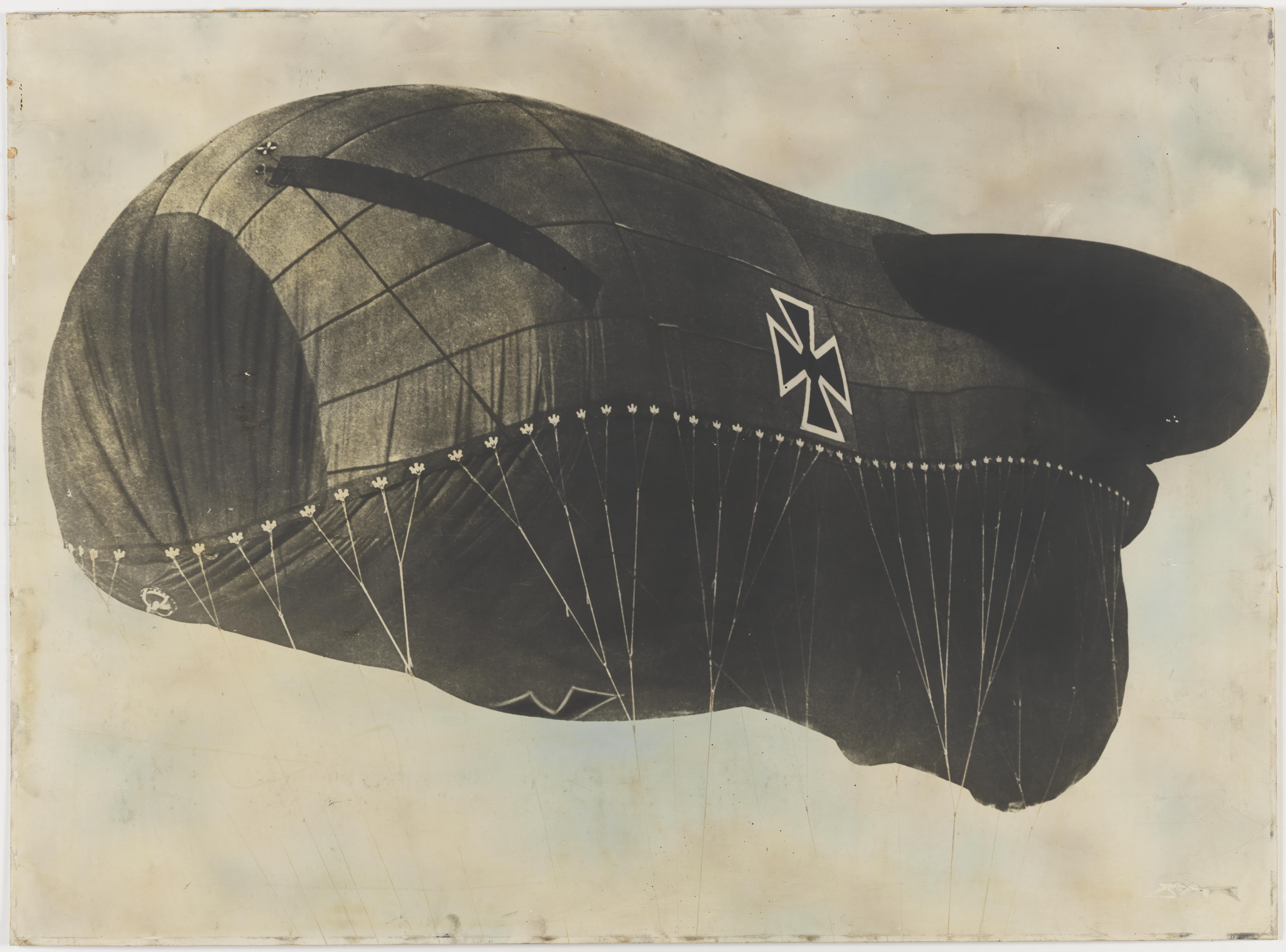
WWI German observation balloon

World War I observation crews were the first to use parachutes, long before they were adopted by fixed wing aircrews. These were a primitive type, where the main part was in a bag suspended from the balloon, with the pilot only wearing a simple body harness around his waist, with lines from the harness attached to the main parachute in the bag. When the balloonist jumped, the main part of the parachute was pulled from the bag, with the shroud lines first, followed by the main canopy. This type of parachute was adopted by the Germans and later by the British and French for their observation balloon crews.

Kite balloons began to be used at sea for anti-submarine purposes towards the end of World War I. The Red Army of the Soviet Union used observation balloons for artillery spotting. Eight aeronautical sections existed, and 19,985 observation flights were performed by balloonists of the Red Army during the Second World War, clocking up 20,126 flight hours. 110 Soviet observation balloons were lost.

Observation balloons also played a role during the Cold War; for example, Project Mogul used high-altitude observation balloons to monitor Soviet nuclear tests, while Project Genetrix used similar balloons to photograph the Soviet Union and China. Unlike previous observation balloons, these balloons were unmanned, ejecting their film to be recovered in midair by specially modified aircraft. However, heavier-than-air craft now perform the vast majority of operations. Aerostats were used by US and coalition military forces in Iraq and in Afghanistan.

From late January to early February 2023, a balloon originating from China was spotted in United States airspace. The Chinese government claimed it was a weather balloon, while the United States government claimed it was a spy balloon. On June 29, 2023, Patrick S. Ryder, a DoD Spokesperson, said in a press conference that the balloon did not collect/transmit while it was transiting/flying over the United States and US military efforts contributed to the block. In an interview aired on CBS News Sunday Morning on Sep 17, 2023, Mark Milley told David Martin that the balloon was not spying and it was a high confidence assessment by the United States Intelligence Community that there was no intelligence collection and transmission by the balloon.

== Notable programs ==
- Project Genetrix
- Project Moby Dick
- Project Mogul

== See also ==
- 2023 Chinese balloon incident
- American observation balloon service in World War I
- Air observation post
- Balloon buster
- Barrage balloon
- Roswell incident
- Surveillance aircraft
- Surveillance blimp
- Union Army Balloon Corps
- Tethered balloon
