= L'Intrépide =

1795 French observation balloon

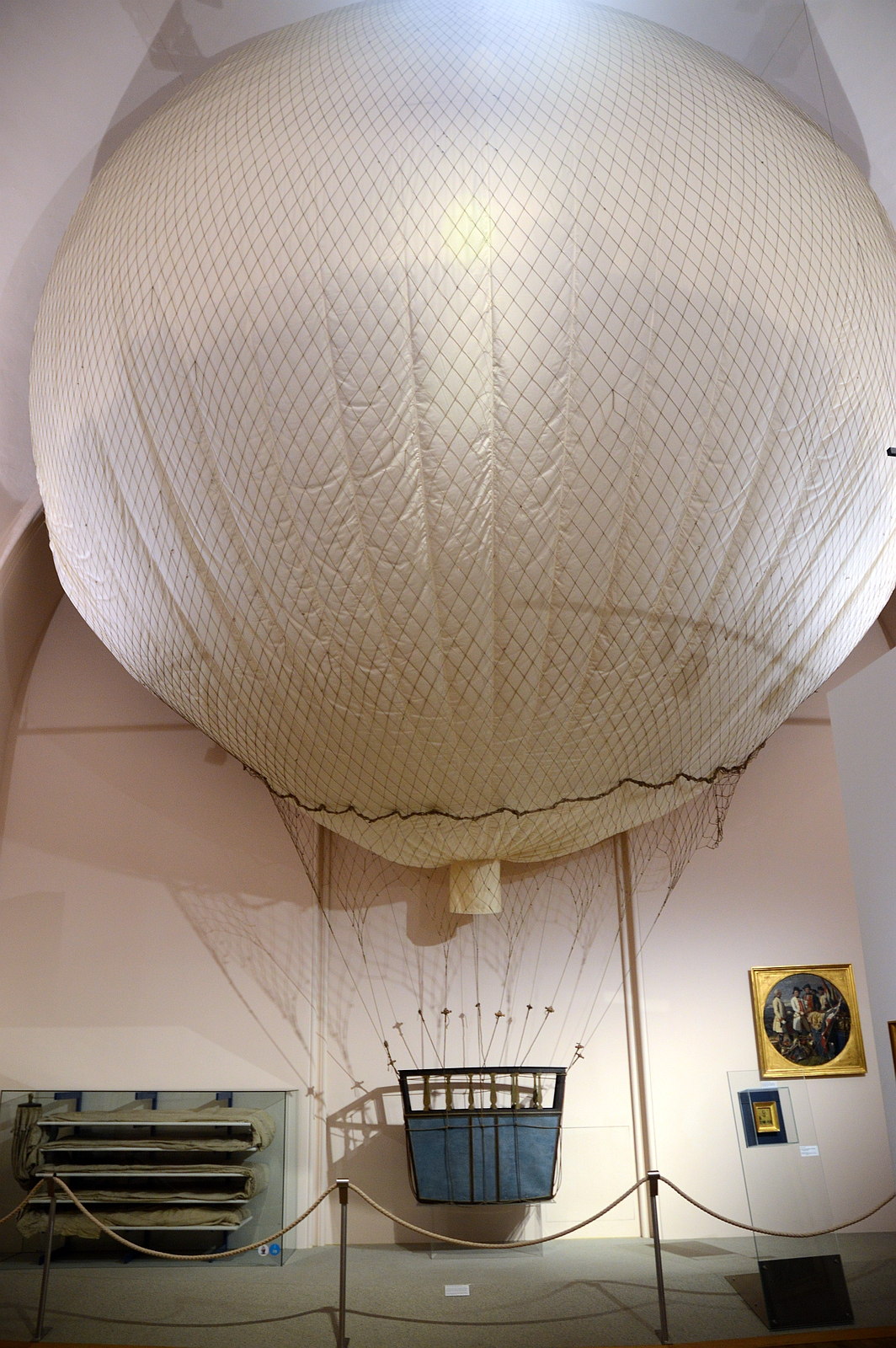
- L'Intrépide on display at the Heeresgeschichtliches Museum.

General information
- Type: Hydrogen balloon
- Owners: Compagnie d'Aérostiers

History
- In service: 1795 - 1796
- Last flight: September 1796; 229 years ago
- Preserved at: On display at the Heeresgeschichtliches Museum in Vienna
- Fate: Captured by Austrian forces

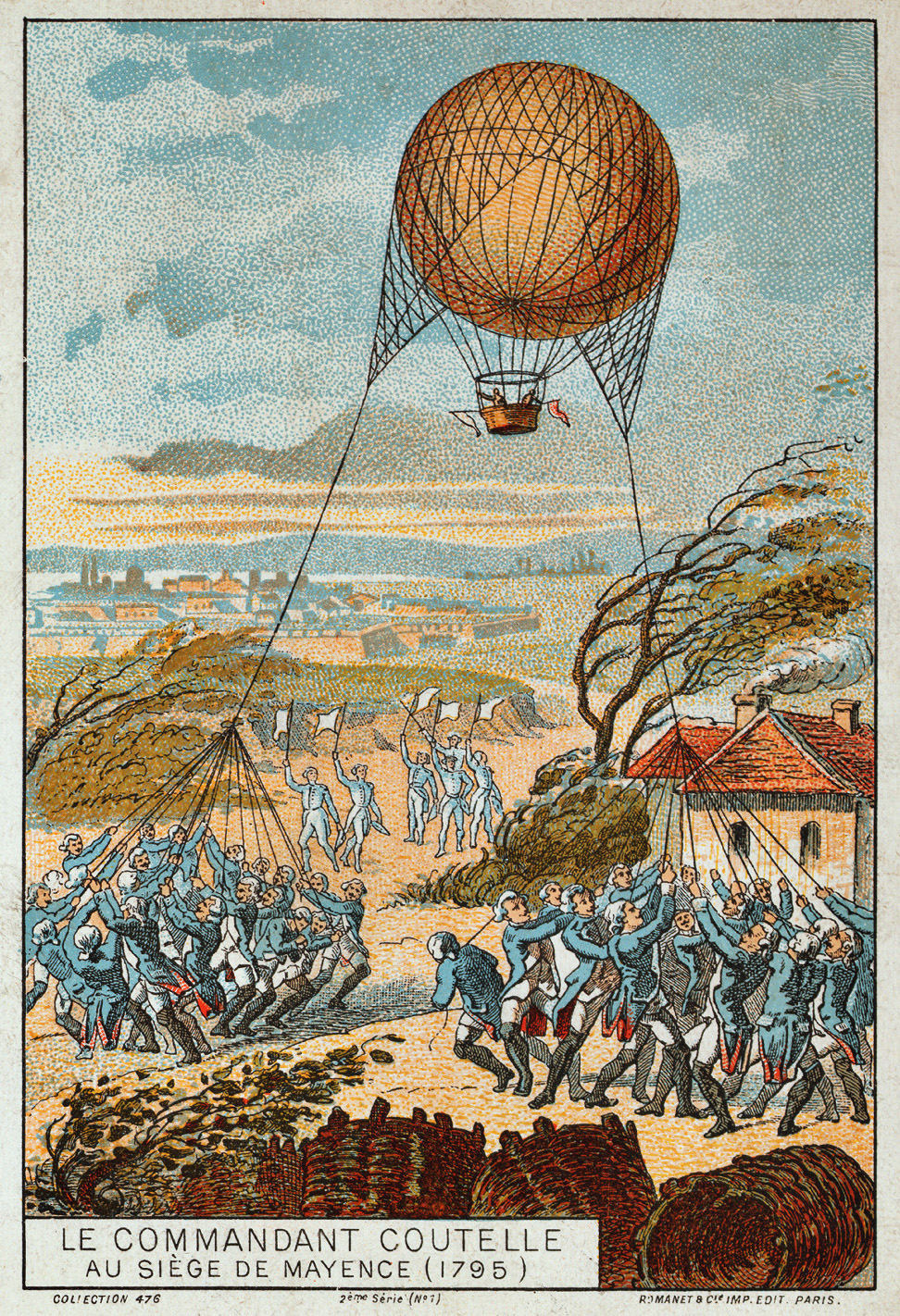
L'Intrépide or Hércule flown at the siege of Mainz (1795); print of 1890.

L'Intrépide ("The Intrepid") is a hydrogen balloon of the Compagnie d'Aérostiers (French Aerostatic Corps) and is the oldest preserved manned aircraft in Europe.

L'Intrépide was the larger of two observation balloons, the other being Hercule ("Hercules"), issued to the Aerostatic Corps in June 1795, twelve years after the pioneering hydrogen balloon flights of Professor Jacques Charles and the Robert brothers in Paris. These balloons were used by the Corps's first company attached to General Jourdan's Army of Sambre-et-Meuse in 1796. When that army was defeated by Austrian forces at the Battle of Würzburg on 3 September 1796, the balloon was captured and taken to Vienna, where it is now on display at the Heeresgeschichtliches Museum.

The balloon's silk envelope is roughly spherical and has a diameter of 9.8 metres (32 ft). Its wooden gondola is very small, measuring 1.14 metres (45 in) by 0.75 metres (30 in) and its railing has a height of 1.05 metres (41 in). The balloon envelope is a replica, with the original displayed folded in a glass case nearby.
