= François Michel de Rozière =

French mining engineer and mineralogist

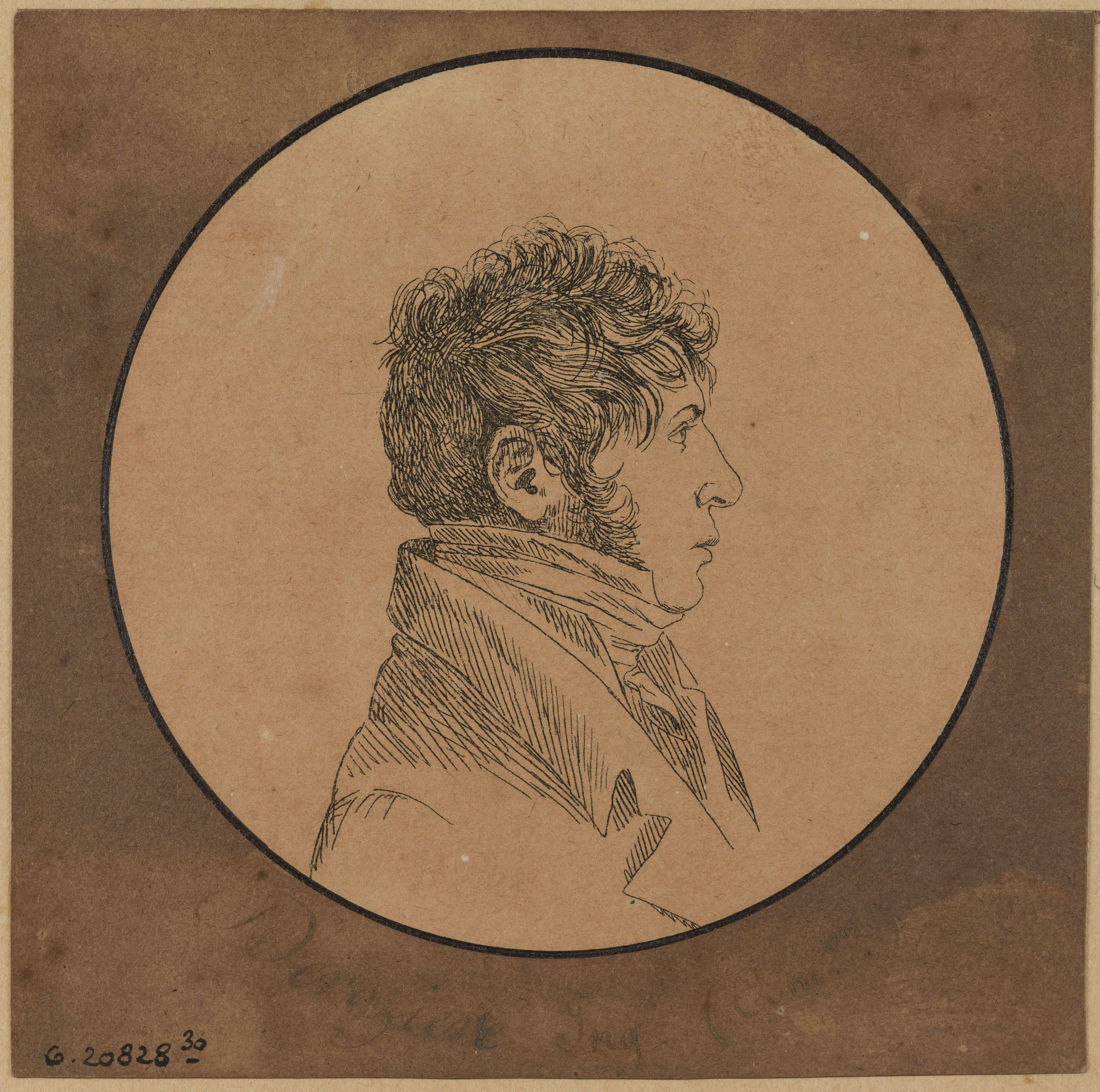
Portrait by André Dutertre, 1798–1801

François Michel de Rozière (29 September 1775, Melun – 4 November 1842, Melun) was a French mining engineer and mineralogist.

== Life ==
He was a member of the Commission des Sciences et des Arts during the French invasion of Egypt of 1798 and travelled up and down the Nile valley looking for stones of all kinds. In January 1799 he explored the Fayum region. On Dolomieu's premature departure in March 1799 he became chief mineralogist to the expedition. In December he took part in the reconnaissance for the Cairo-Suez itinerary, then in November 1800 he and the engineer Coutelle were authorised to accompany the 1,800-camel-strong Tor caravan to Sinai. During this desert journey he added observation of the local population to his scientific work, thinking that the landscape's physical state must show signs of the ancient way of life. It was in this vein that he wrote his colossal work on minerals, a very detailed study of the measuring system of ancient Egypt.

On his return to France he rose to engineer in chief in 1810, becoming a professor at the École des Mines at Saint-Étienne in 1819. He was chief engineer of the mines at Nevers from 1828, then a chevalier de la légion d'honneur, before being allowed to retire in 1832. Returning to Paris, he died, overwhelmed by infirmities following a fall from a horse in around 1813.
