= Jean-Marie-Joseph Coutelle =

French engineer, scientist and pioneer of ballooning

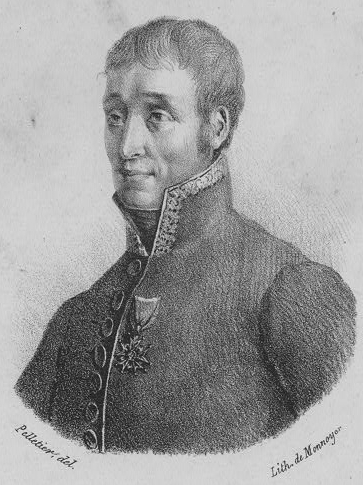
Colonel Coutelle, head of the aérostiers in 1794.

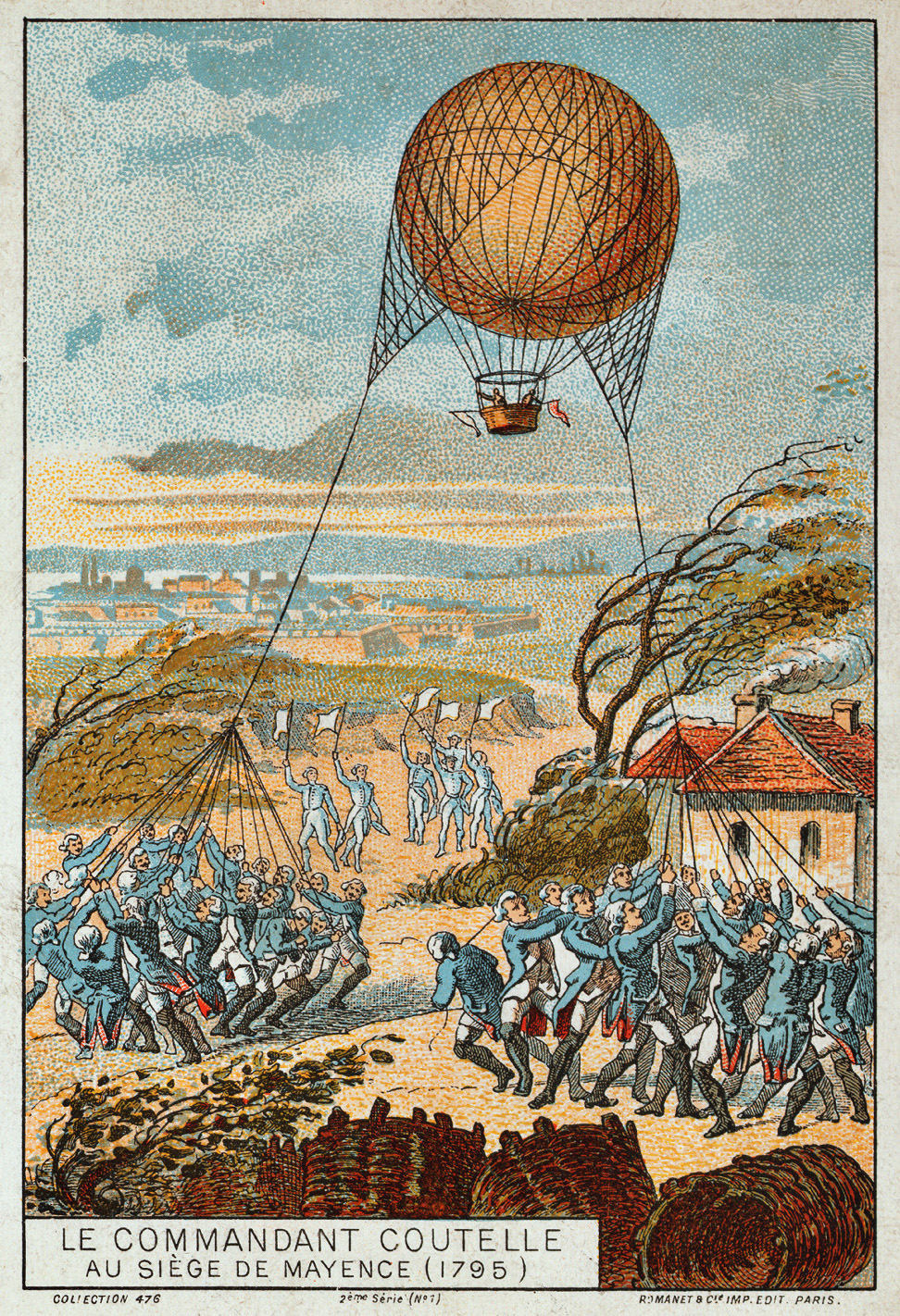
« Colonel Coutelle with his balloon during the siege of Mainz. »

Jean-Marie-Joseph Coutelle (3 January 1748, in Le Mans – 20 March 1835, in Paris) was a French engineer, scientist and pioneer of ballooning.

== Life ==
He got to know the physicist Alexandre Charles and, in the wake of the experiences of the Montgolfier brothers, Coutelle and Charles became interested in balloons. On 2 April 1794 the National Convention made Coutelle a captain and first officer of the Company of Aeronauts and ordered him to build balloons to aid the French Revolutionary armies. In this role Coutelle was attached to the French invasion of Egypt of 1798 under Napoleon Bonaparte, but he was unable to function in this role in Egypt since the warship carrying his materials was severely damaged by fire during the Battle of the Nile.

Instead he became one of the scholars of the Commission des Sciences et des Arts. In November 1800 Coutelle and the mining engineer Rozière were authorised to accompany the great caravan of Tor, which was heading to Sinai with 1,800 camels. A member of the Costaz commission, he began to admire the two obelisks at Luxor and suggested to the Institut d'Égypte a new way of transporting one of them to France - 30 years later, a similar method to his suggestion was used to transport one to the Place de la Concorde in Paris, where it now stands. He also used his ballooning expertise for Napoleon's planned invasion of Britain. He became a member of the Légion d’honneur on 17 January 1805, then a Chevalier de l’Empire on 28 June 1809. He died in 1835 and was buried in the 11th division of the cimetière du Père-Lachaise - his tomb was restored in 2004 by the "Souvenir français".
