= French Aerostatic Corps =

French air reconnaissance unit in Napoleonic War

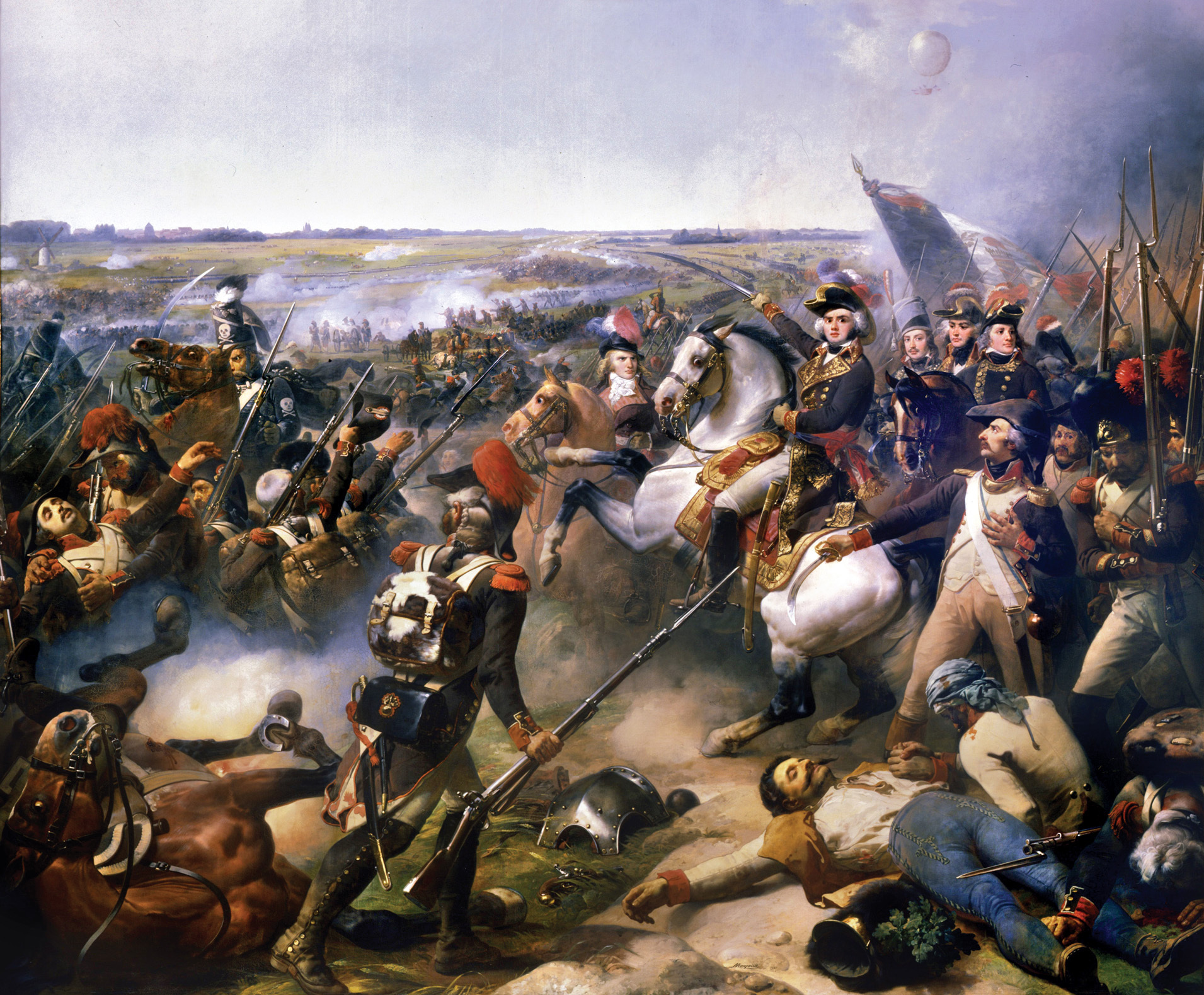
- An Aerostatic Corps balloon at the Battle of Fleurus
- Active: 1794–1802
- Country: France
- Branch: French Revolutionary Army
- Type: Balloon engineers
- Role: Reconnaissance
- Size: Two companies of 26 personnel
- Colors: Blue with a black trim
- Engagements: Battle of Fleurus, Battle of Mainz, Battle of Würzburg, Battle of the Nile

Commanders
- Notable commanders: Jean-Marie-Joseph Coutelle, Nicolas Lhomond

Aircraft flown
- Reconnaissance: L'Entreprenant, Hercule, L'Intrépide

The French Aerostatic Corps or Company of Aeronauts (French: compagnie d'aérostiers) was a unit of the French Revolutionary Army. The world's first manned aircraft unit, it was founded in 1794 to use balloons primarily for reconnaissance duties. The French Directory disbanded the unit in 1799 but it was not fully disbanded until 1802.

== Experimentation ==
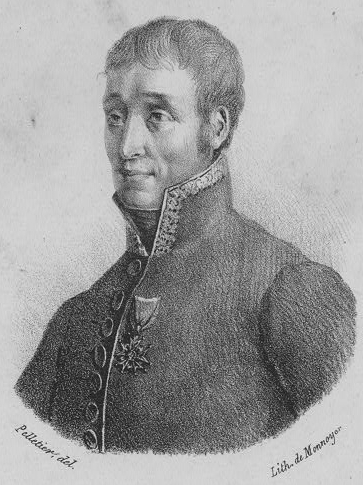
Coutelle in 1794.

Numerous suggestions had been made for the use of balloons during the French Revolutionary Wars, and in 1793 the Committee of Public Safety began testing their potential. Initial tests of airship designs proved unsatisfactory. However, experiments conducted near the Tuileries from September to October 1793 to produce the required hydrogen without the use of sulphuric acid, which was in short supply, were successful, producing more than 20 cubic metres. As a result, the Committee determined to use this technique to float tethered balloons.

At the end of October 1793, chemist Jean-Marie-Joseph Coutelle and his assistant, the engineer Nicolas Lhomond, were sent to join the Army of the North, with 50,000 livre to acquire equipment. They were given a letter from Lazare Carnot commending them to General Jean-Baptiste Jourdan and representative Ernest Dominique François Joseph Duquesnoy, which informed them that "Citizen Coutelle is not a charlatan". However, on arrival, Jourdan ridiculed the project, ordering Coutelle back to Paris, with the message that an Austrian attack was imminent, and a battalion was required, not a balloon.

== Formation ==
Back in Paris, the Committee of Public Safety ordered further tests on the balloon technology, to be conducted at the Chateau de Meudon, where the Aerostatic Development Centre was founded. Nicolas-Jacques Conté led the research, refining balloon shapes and materials, and also improving the hydrogen production process. This culminated in a series of ascensions, viewed by leading figures on the Committee, who passed an Act creating the Aerostatic Corps on 2 April 1794. The corps consisted of a captain and a lieutenant, a sergeant-major and sergeant, two corporals and twenty privates. All these men were required to have skills relevant to ballooning, such as chemistry or carpentry. The Act creating the corps envisaged three roles: reconnaissance, signalling and the distribution of propaganda. Coutelle was created captain, and Lhomond lieutenant.

== Battle of Fleurus ==
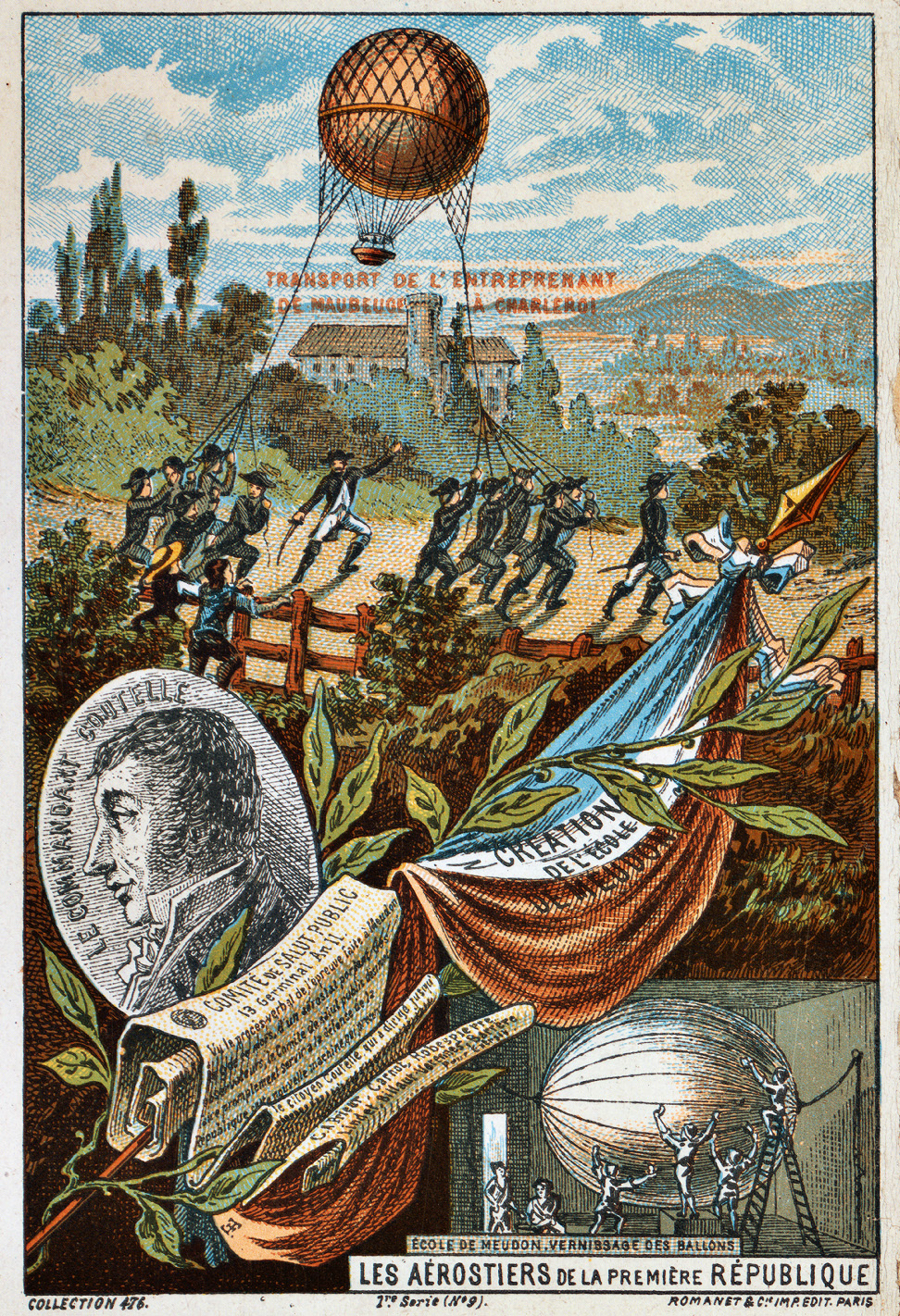
The corps transporting the balloon to Fleurus.

In May 1794, the new corps joined Jourdan's troops at Maubeuge, bringing one balloon: L'Entreprenant. They began by constructing a furnace, then extracting hydrogen. The first military use of the balloon was on 2 June, when it was used for reconnaissance during an enemy bombardment. On 22 June, the corps received orders to move the balloon to the plain of Fleurus, in front of the Austrian troops at Charleroi. This was achieved by twenty soldiers who dragged the inflated balloon across thirty miles of ground. For the three following days, an officer ascended to make further observations. On 26 June, the Battle of Fleurus was fought, and the balloon remained afloat for nine hours, during which Coutelle and Antoine Morlot took notes on the movements of the Austrian Army, dropping them to the ground for collection by the French Army, and also signalled messages using semaphore.

The French won the Battle of Fleurus, but reports of the usefulness of the balloon corps varied. Louis-Bernard Guyton de Morveau, who had been present throughout the battle, strongly supported it, but Jourdan believed that it had contributed little. Guyton had already supervised the construction at Meudon of the Martial, a cylindrical balloon, which was supplied to the corps soon after the battle, but it proved too unstable for use. The corps followed the Army of the North into Belgium and was present at battles in Liege and Brussels, although they did not see action. With winter approaching, they constructed a balloon depot at Borcette near Aachen.

== Second company ==
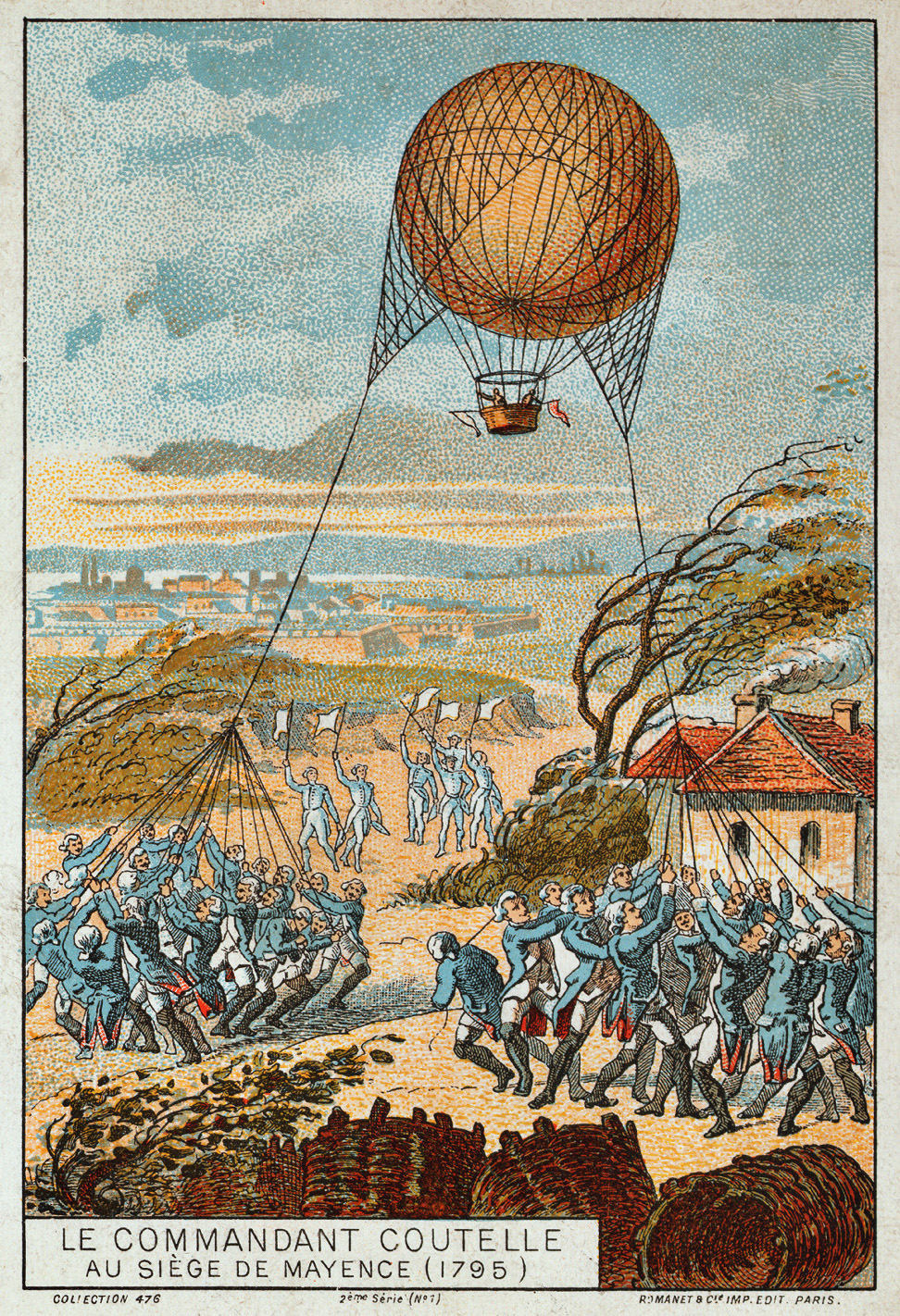
Observations by the second company at the Battle of Mainz

On 23 June, an Act creating a second aerostatic company had been passed, to be trained at Meudon by Conté. It was provided with two new balloons, Hercule and L'Intrépide, and in March 1795 it was attached to the Army of the Rhine. Coutelle was recalled in order to head the new company, Lhomond being promoted to captain of the first company, while Conté remained at Meudon. In October, he was made head of a new school of ballooning, where replacement soldiers for the two companies were trained.

The second company conducted ascensions at the Battle of Mainz, and were also active during the evacuation of Mannheim. For the winter, they established a base at Frankheim, then followed the Army north and conducted observations at Stuttgart, Rastatt and Donauwörth.

== Decline and disbanding ==
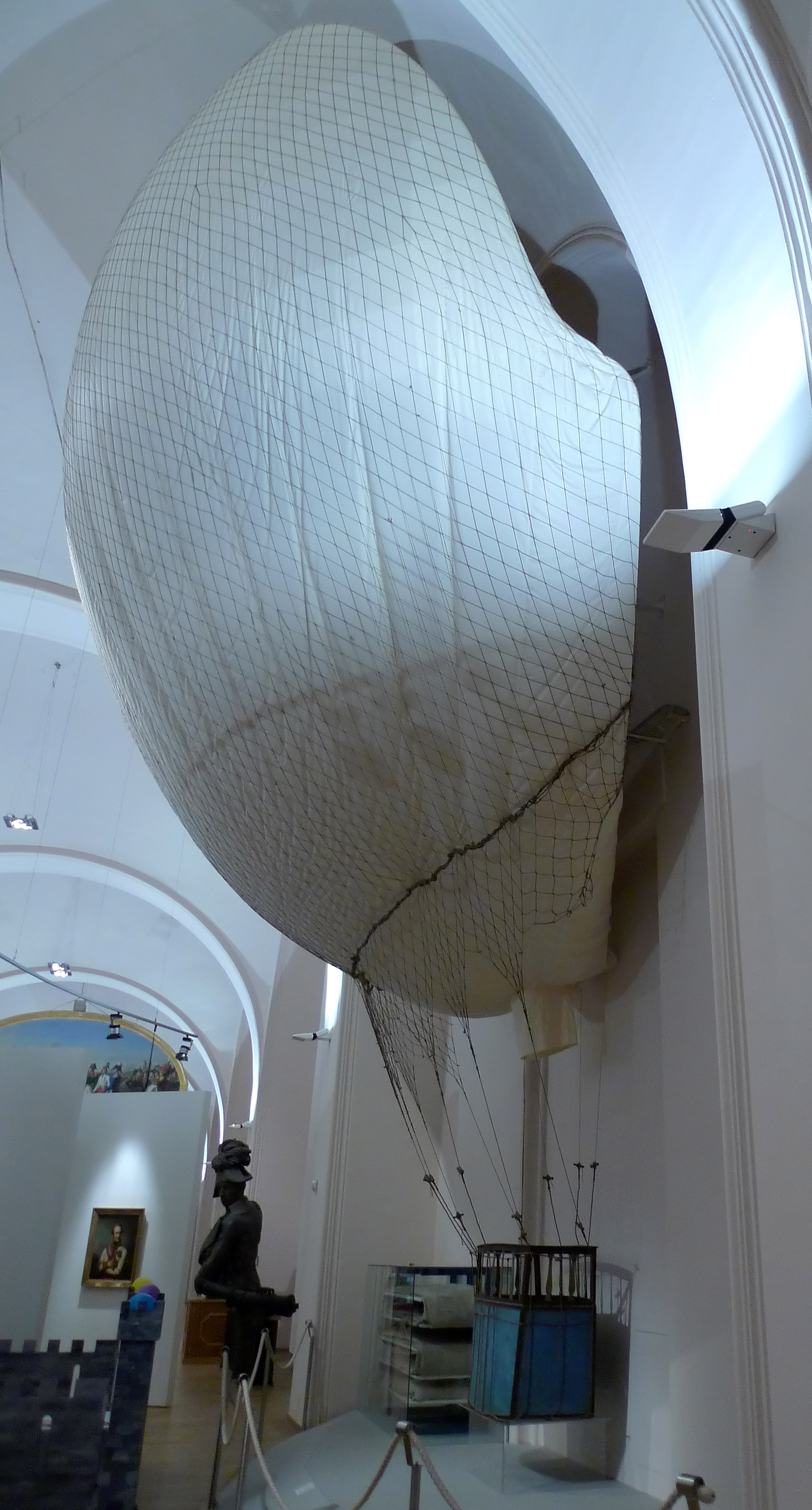
L'Intrépide on display at the Heeresgeschichtliches Museum.

Meanwhile, in 1795, the first company was transferred to the Army of Sambre-et-Meuse, which was now led by Jourdan. They were not directly involved in any action, but Jourdan appears to have warmed to the balloonists, printing official correspondence forms depicting a balloon above his army. In September 1796, they were at the Battle of Würzburg when the French Army was defeated, and the entire company was taken captive with its balloon L'Intrépide, which is now on display at the Heeresgeschichtliches Museum in Vienna.

Following this disaster, the second company was attached to the reconstructed Army of Sambre-et-Meuse. Coutelle withdrew to Meudon, overcome by fever, and new commander Delaunay was unable to work with the new General, Lazare Hoche, who refused to let them participate in any action.

The first company were released in April 1797, under the terms of the Treaty of Leoben, and petitioned for the reinstatement of Coutelle as their commander. This was permitted; Coutelle was made a colonel, while Lhomond was promoted to major and permitted to remain second-in-command. In 1798, the company participated in the French invasion of Egypt. On arrival in Egypt, they decided to initially leave the ballooning equipment on their ship. This was destroyed in the Battle of the Nile, and the company was assigned to other duties. They were able to conduct a few demonstrations of more basic balloons for entertainment purposes.

On 15 January 1799, the French Directory passed an act disbanding the balloon corps. The second company was immediately disbanded, but the first was still in action in Egypt and remained in existence until its return to France in 1802.
