= 1794 in Belgium =

- Decades
- See also: Other events of 1794; List of years in Belgium

Events of the year 1794 in the Austrian Netherlands and the Prince-Bishopric of Liège (predecessor states of modern Belgium).

== Incumbents ==
- Sovereign: Francis II, Holy Roman Emperor
- Prince-Bishop of Liège: François Antoine Marie Constantin de Méan et de Beaurieux (to 20 July)
- Governor General of the Austrian Netherlands: Charles of Austria-Lorraine

== Events ==
April

- 17–18 April – Battle of Arlon between French and Coalition forces.
- 23 April – Francis II acclaimed Duke of Brabant and Limburg in Brussels.
- 26–30 April – Battle of Mouscron between French and Coalition forces.

May

- 10–12 May – Second Battle of Courtrai between French and Coalition forces.
- 13 May – Battle of Grandreng between French and Coalition forces.
- 18 May – Battle of Tourcoing between French and Coalition forces.
- 20–24 May – Battle of Erquelinnes between French and Coalition forces.
- 22 May – Battle of Tournai between French and Coalition forces.
- 30 May – Battle of Gosselies between French and Coalition forces begins.
- French troops set fire to Aulne Abbey and Lobbes Abbey.

June

- 1 June – Siege of Ypres by French Revolutionary forces begins.
- 3 June – Battle of Gosselies between French and Coalition forces concludes.
- 12–16 June – Battle of Lambusart between French and Coalition forces.
- 18 June – Siege of Ypres by French Revolutionary forces ends.
- 26 June – Battle of Fleurus: decisive French victory in the Flanders Campaign of the French Revolutionary Wars.

July

- 9 July – Tree of Liberty erected on the Place Royale (Brussels).
- 11 July – French forces muster in Brussels.
- 20 July – François Antoine Marie Constantin de Méan et de Beaurieux, prince-bishop of Liège, flees to Germany.
- 23 July – Antwerp occupied by French forces.

August

- 9 August – Hefty supplementary tax on nobility and religious houses, with hostages taken to ensure payment.

September

- 17–18 September – Battle of Sprimont: final Austrian defeat in the Low Countries
- 21 September – Artworks confiscated from castles, churches and religious houses shipped to France.

October

- 2 October – French forces reach the Rhine.
- 15 October – Administrative reorganisation of occupied provinces proposed.

November

- 16 November – Administrative reorganisation adopted, introducing arrondissements, civil marriage, free trade with France; abolishing monopolies and noble titles.
- 26 November – French authorities order requisitioning and stockpiling of food.

December

- Fortifications of Charleroi dismantled.

== Births ==
February

- 26 February – Barthélémy de Theux de Meylandt, politician (died 1874)

April

- 4 April – Jean-Joseph Charlier, revolutionary (died 1886)

September

- 9 September – Léandre Desmaisières, politician (died 1864)
- 16 September – Floris Nollet, inventor (died 1853)

Date uncertain

- Johannes Baptista van Acker, painter (died 1863)

== Deaths ==
April

- 4 April – Hendrik-Jozef Antonissen (born 1737), painter

July

- 7 July – Charles-Alexandre de Hénin-Liétard d'Alsace (born 1744), nobleman
- 13 July – Josse-François-Joseph Benaut (born c.1743), composer and harpsichordist
