= 1797 in Belgium =

- Decades
- See also: Other events of 1797; List of years in Belgium

Events in the year 1797 in the Belgian Departments of France. The French First Republic had annexed the Austrian Netherlands and Prince-bishopric of Liège (predecessor states of modern Belgium) in 1795 and had reorganised the territory as the nine departments Dyle, Escaut, Forêts, Jemmape, Lys, Meuse-Inférieure, Deux-Nèthes, Ourthe, and Sambre-et-Meuse.

The year 1797 corresponds to the period from 12 Nivôse of Year V to 11 Nivôse of Year VI in the French Republican Calendar.

== Incumbents ==
- Directors
  - Paul Barras
  - Louis Marie de La Révellière-Lépeaux
  - Jean-François Rewbell
  - Étienne-François Letourneur (to 26 May), François-Marie de Barthélemy (from 26 May to 5 September), Philippe-Antoine Merlin de Douai (from 5 September)
  - Lazare Carnot (to 5 September), François de Neufchâteau (from 5 September)

== Events ==
February

- 16 February – Abbey of St. Peter in Oudenburg sold at auction.

April

- 28 April – auction of Dominican convent and church in Antwerp begins; buildings bought by Prior Cornelius Peltiers.

October

- 18 October – By the Treaty of Campo Formio the Austrian monarchy accepts the French annexation of the former Austrian Netherlands.
- 25 October – University of Leuven suppressed by decree.

November

- 20 November – French authorities begin compiling lists of priests in Belgium
- 25 November – Law of 5 Frimaire confiscates property of all religious colleges, seminaries and confraternities (implementation started 31 December).

== Births ==
- 2 February – Joseph Guislain, physician (died 1860)
- 17 September – Eugène-Henri Defacqz, magistrate (died 1871)
- 21 October – Charles Moerman d'Harlebeke, senator (died 1854)

== Deaths ==
- 4 May – Jan-Baptist Verlooy (born 1746), revolutionary
- 17 May – Johannes Joseph Beerenbroek (born 1717), industrialist
