= Battle of Erquelinnes =

Battle of the War of the First Coalition

Coordinates: 50°18′N 4°7′E

- Part of War of the First Coalition
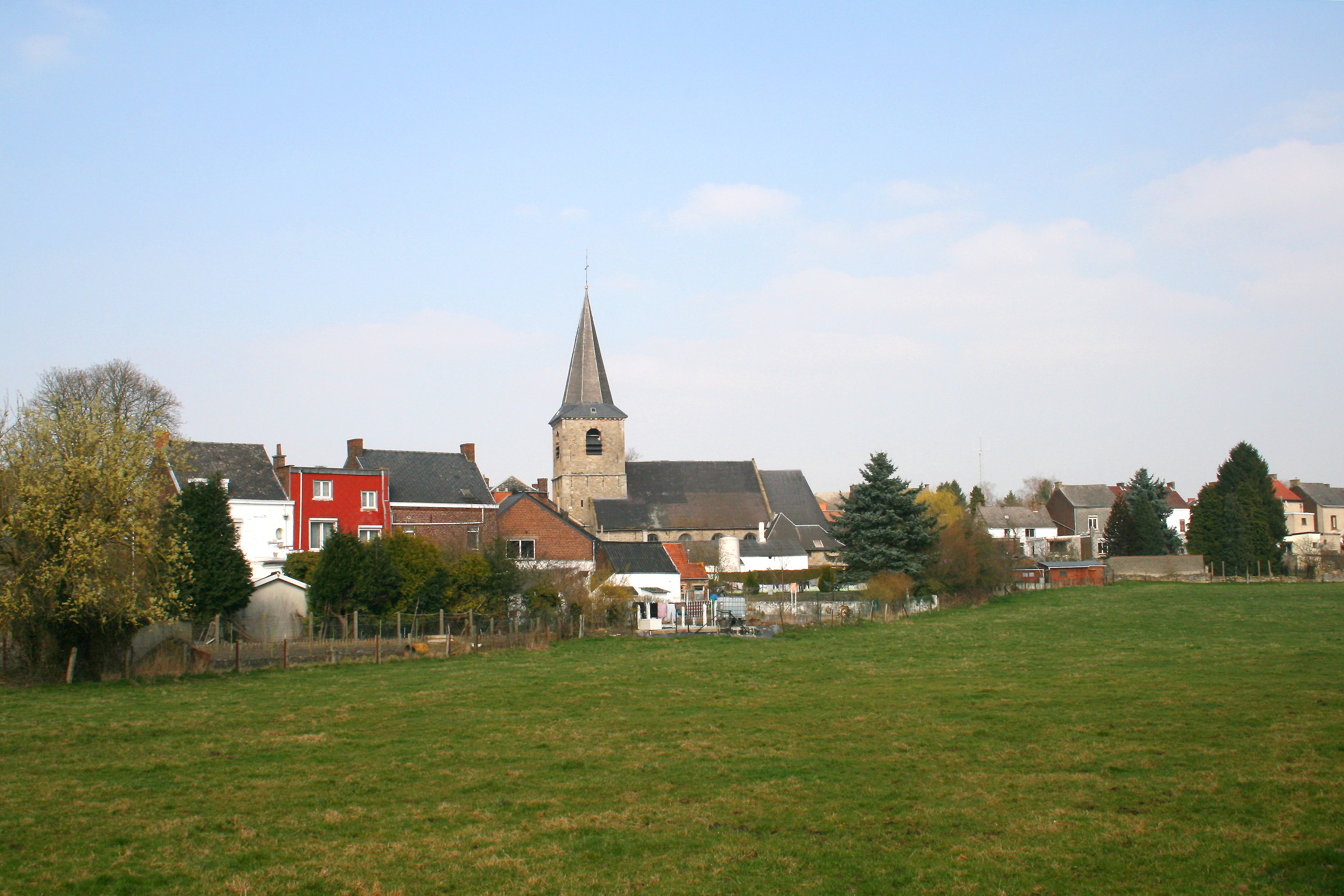
- The village of Erquelinnes (shown in 2009) was the scene of fighting on 21 and 24 May 1794.
Date	24 May 1794
Location	Erquelinnes, Belgium
Result	Austro-Dutch victory

Belligerents
(Habsburg monarchy) Habsburg Austria; Dutch Republic	(France) French First Republic

Commanders and leaders
(Habsburg monarchy) Graf von Kaunitz	(France) Jacques Desjardin (France) Louis Charbonnier

Strength
24,000	30,000–50,000

Casualties and losses
611–650	3,000–5,400, 25–32 guns 40 wagons, 3 colors

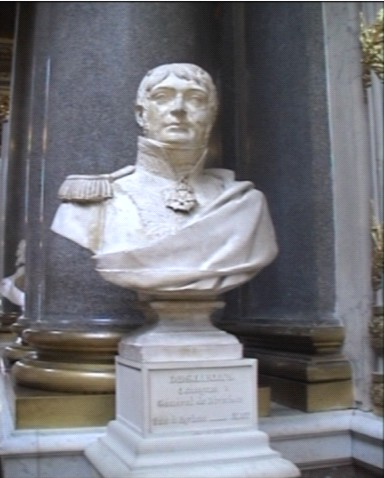
Jacques Desjardin

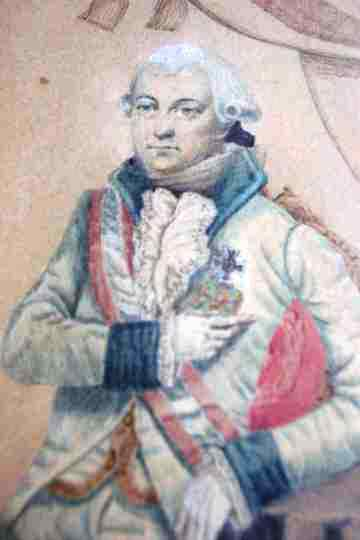
Franz von Kaunitz

The Battle of Erquelinnes or Battle of Péchant (24 May 1794) was part of the Flanders Campaign during the War of the First Coalition, and saw a Republican French army jointly led by Jacques Desjardin and Louis Charbonnier try to defend a bridgehead on the north bank of the Sambre River against a combined Habsburg Austrian and Dutch army led by Franz Wenzel, Graf von Kaunitz-Rietberg. The French crossed the Sambre on the 20th and held their positions for a few days. On the 24th Kaunitz launched an early-morning surprise attack that routed the French. The War of the First Coalition combat represented the second of five French attempts to gain a foothold on the north bank of the Sambre. Erquelinnes is a village in Belgium directly on the border with France. It is situated about 30 kilometres (19 mi) southwest of Charleroi.

Jean-Charles Pichegru, the top French military commander in the north formed a mass of 60,000 troops by joining Desjardin's three-division right wing of the Army of the North to Charbonnier's two-division Army of the Ardennes. Without a single leader to control the force, Desjardin's troops were beaten by Kaunitz at Grand-Reng on 13 May while Charbonnier's men stood idle nearby. On the 20th, the combined force recrossed the Sambre and repelled Kaunitz's attempt to dislodge them on the 21st. Again there were command problems when Desjardin missed an opportunity because he could not issue orders to one of Charbonnier's divisions. After two days of hesitation, the French sent 15,000 men under Jean Baptiste Kléber north on a raid to seize Nivelles. Kaunitz's sudden assault on 24 May overwhelmed his foes' defenses and the French were saved from catastrophic losses when Kléber turned back and marched to the rescue. Desjardin and Charbonnier would try again but suffer a third defeat at Gosselies on 3 June. After that a new general would try a fourth time at Lambusart on 16 June before achieving success at Fleurus on 26 June.

== Background ==
=== Operations ===
The Coalition army successfully concluded the Siege of Landrecies on 30 April 1794 and took 5,000 French prisoners. This victory nearly cut the French armies in half and led to a change in strategy. The Committee of Public Safety ordered the 70,000-strong left wing of the Army of the North under Jean-Charles Pichegru to capture Ypres and Tournai. The 24,000-man center under Jacques Ferrand was instructed to guard the communications between the French left and right wings while keeping an eye on the Coalition army. On the right, the Army of the Ardennes under Louis Charbonnier and the right wing of the Army of the North under Jacques Desjardin were to assemble near Philippeville. Numbering 60,000 soldiers, this body was directed to march northwest toward Mons. Farther to the southeast, Army of the Moselle commanded by Jean-Baptiste Jourdan was ordered to send a force toward Namur via Arlon.

On 4 May 1794, the French left wing divisions were posted as follows, from left to right, Pierre Antoine Michaud with 14,238 men at Bergues, Jean Victor Marie Moreau with 15,744 troops at Menen (Menin), Joseph Souham with 31,115 soldiers at Kortrijk (Courtrai), Nicolas Pierquin with 8,423 men at Cantin and Pierre-Jacques Osten with 7,569 troops at Pont-à-Marcq. The center consisted of the divisions of Paul-Alexis Dubois with 11,353 soldiers at Bohéries Abbey and Antoine Balland with 12,701 men at Guise. The Army of the North right wing divisions were led by Jacques Fromentin with 15,749 troops at Avesnes-sur-Helpe, Éloi Laurent Despeaux with 7,042 soldiers at Limont-Fontaine and Desjardin with 10,075 men at Beaumont, Belgium. The Army of the Ardennes had a single division under Philippe Joseph Jacob with 21,851 troops at Boussu-lez-Walcourt. Jourdan's 21,000-strong Arlon force had three divisions under Jean Étienne Championnet, François Joseph Lefebvre and Antoine Morlot. These were the soldiers available for service in the field, excluding garrisons.

At the same time, the 30,000-strong Coalition left wing was led by Prince Frederick, Duke of York and Albany and François Sébastien Charles Joseph de Croix, Count of Clerfayt and deployed from Nieuport to Denain. Supreme commander Prince Josias of Saxe-Coburg-Saalfeld commanded the 65,000-man center with his headquarters at Le Cateau-Cambrésis. The left wing under Franz Wenzel, Graf von Kaunitz-Rietberg counted 27,000 troops and had its headquarters at Rouveroy. Farther to the southeast, Johann Peter Beaulieu had 8,000 men at Arlon and Ernst Paul Christian von Blankenstein defended Trier with 9,000 more. Kaunitz's wing included 34 battalions, 20 companies and 39 squadrons, the greater part at Bettignies with 2,000 soldiers holding Charleroi and a left wing of 5,000 men led by Karl von Riese watching the crossings of the Sambre and Meuse Rivers.

=== Grand-Reng ===
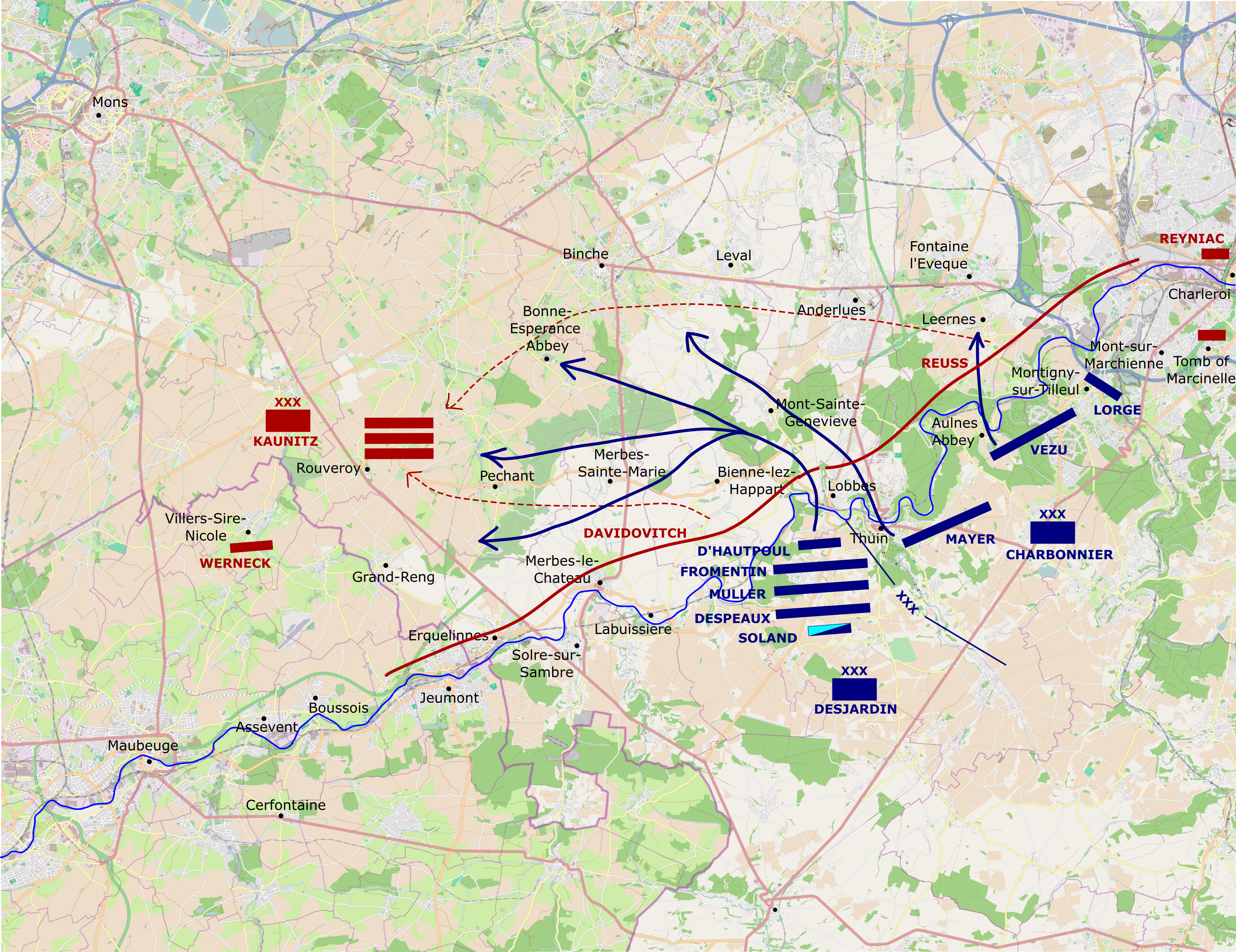
Map of the approximate dispositions of French and Allied troops on 19 May prior to the battle of Erquelinnes, and the second French crossing of the Sambre, on 20 May 1794.

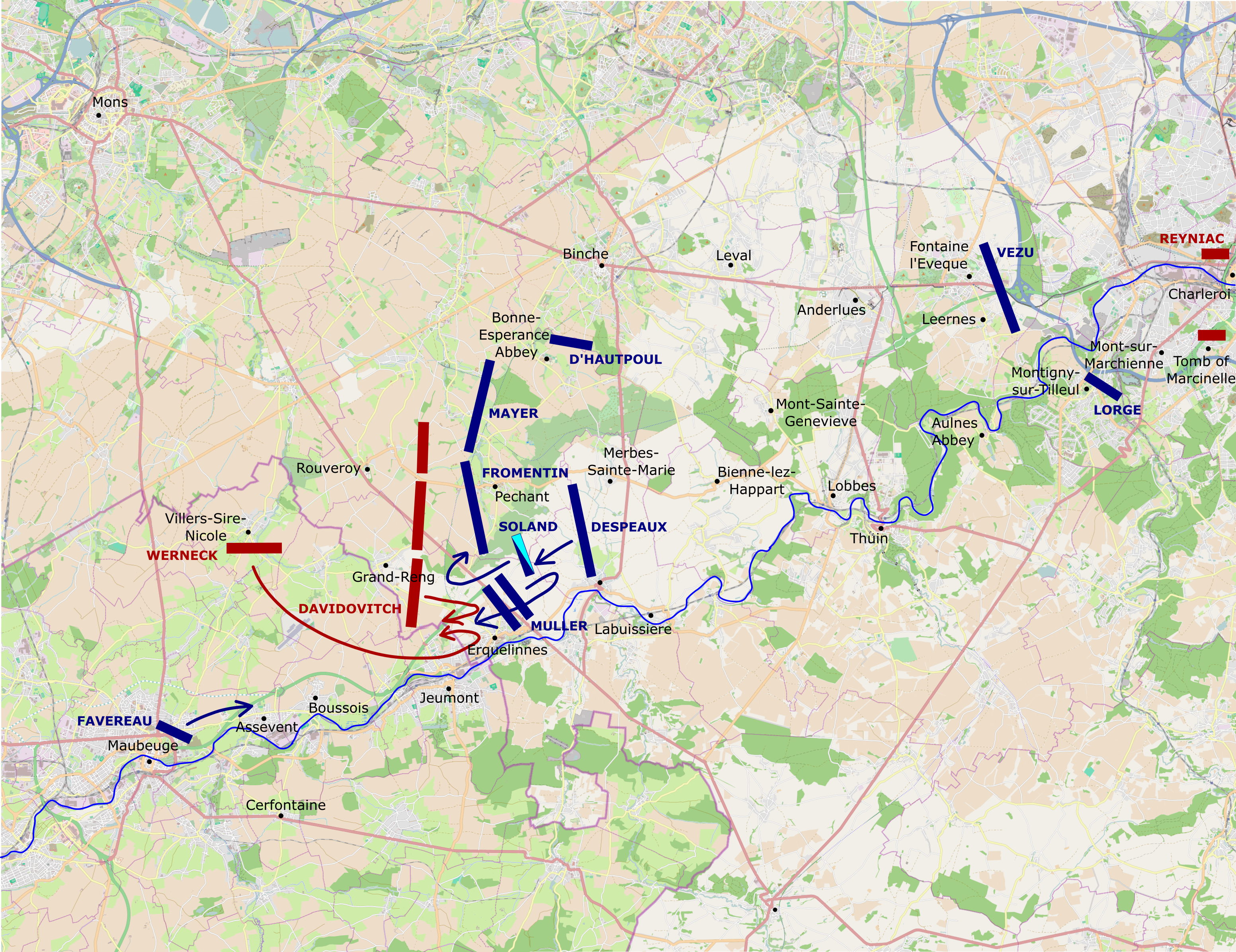
Kaunitz's attack on 21 May. Having advanced up to the Allied entrenched positions, Kaunitz launches an attack on the French left, attempting to flank them away from the river and cut their communications by capturing Erquelinnes. Despite initial success, Davidovitch's and Werneck's attacks are repulsed with a counterattack and French reinforcements. Meanwhile, the French lose an opportunity to outflank the Allies' exposed left with Mayer's division due to their divided command arrangement.

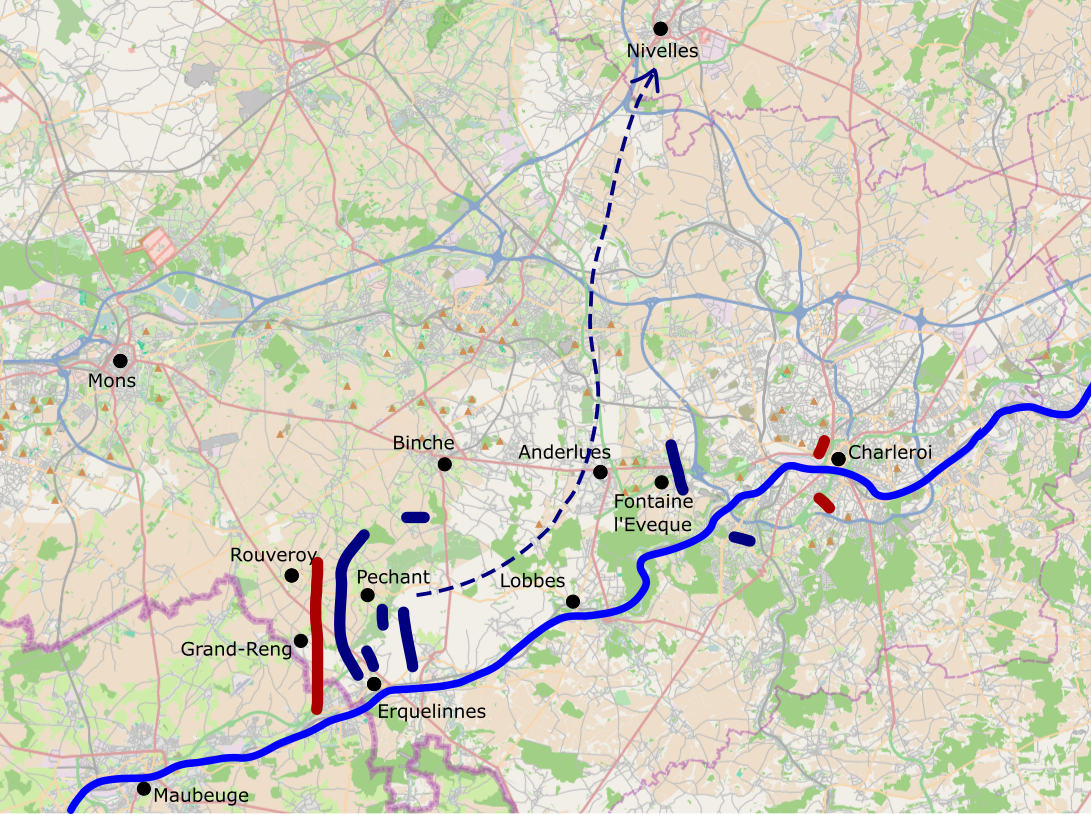
Kleber's intended French raid on Nivelles. Whether intended purely to capture supplies, or to force the enemy to divide his forces to defend Nivelles, the most immediate effect of this sending away of nearly a third of the French army was to drastically weaken the forces facing Kaunitz on the actual day of the battle.

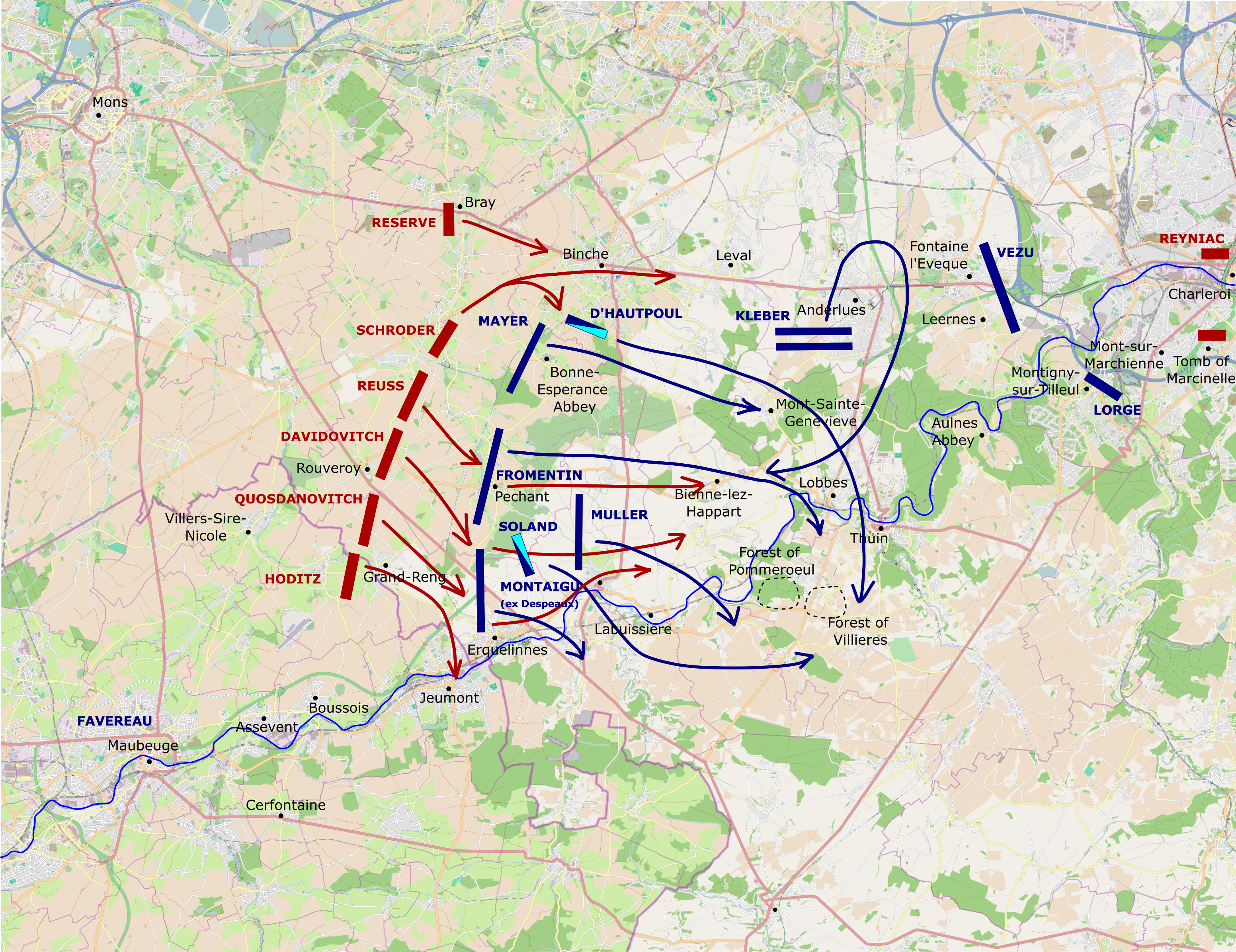
The battle of Erquelinnes, 24 May, first phase. Kaunitz launches an attack in 5 columns on the French forces, which have been weakened by the detachment of Kleber. Caught by surprise, the French divisions are quickly routed back across the Sambre. Fromentin and Mayer's divisions are only saved from destruction by Kleber, who marched to the sound of the guns in time to cover their retreat.

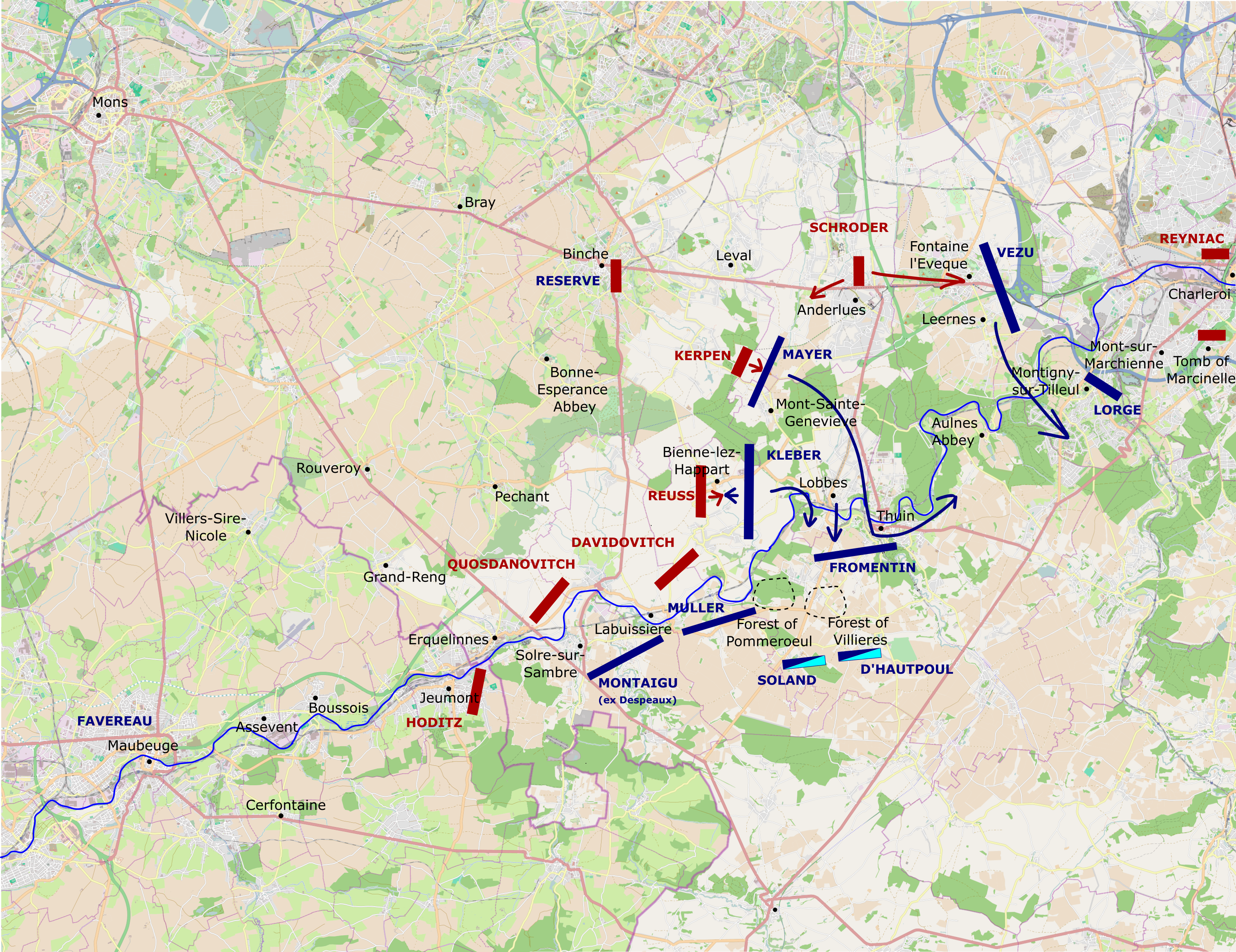
The battle of Erquelinnes, 24 May, second phase. With Montaigu's and Muller's divisions having retreated back across the Sambre, Reuss' column tries to recapture Lobbes, but is stopped by Kleber, who covers the retreats of Fromentin and Mayer's divisions before recrossing himself.

Adjustments were made to the French right wing before its offensive. Charbonnier split his army into two divisions under François Séverin Marceau-Desgraviers and Jacob, plus a detachment under Claude Vezú. François Muller assumed command of Desjardin's division. Leaving Anne Charles Basset Montaigu's 4,741-man brigade to hold Avesnes, Fromentin marched the bulk of his division to the east side of Maubeuge. Despeaux's division made a similar shift. In an extraordinary oversight, Pichegru neglected to appoint a single commander of the right wing, leaving Desjardin and Charbonnier to work out some sort of joint action. To make matters more difficult, the representatives on mission attached to the force were the high-handed Louis Antoine de Saint-Just and Philippe-François-Joseph Le Bas.

At dawn on 10 May 1794, the French force advanced toward the Sambre in seven columns, seizing crossings at Thuin and Lobbes that day. On the 11th, a column crossed at Aulne Abbey farther east and Marceau occupied Fontaine-l'Evêque. On the 12th the French captured Merbes-le-Château to the west. Kaunitz withdrew his corps into an entrenched position with its right flank at Grand-Reng, its center at Rouveroy and its left near Binche. On 13 May 1794 in the Battle of Grand-Reng the French attacked Kaunitz. Muller unsuccessfully assaulted Grand-Reng while Fromentin's attack against the center was stopped by Austrian cavalry. Kaunitz then launched a counterattack which compelled the French to withdraw south of the Sambre with losses of 4,000 men and 12 guns.

Because of the mistakes of its commanders, Kaunitz with no more than 25,000 Coalition soldiers was able to defeat a 53,000-strong French army. On the 13th, Charbonnier's divisions baked bread at Fontaine-l'Evêque and stood idle at Mont-Sainte-Geneviève, leaving Desjardin and his 35,000 troops to do all the fighting. Without attempting any maneuver, Desjardin and his generals threw their soldiers, with no shoes, wet powder and shabby uniforms into the assault against enemies well-protected by solid fieldworks. The French troops lacked support from heavy cannons and had to contend with the superior Austrian cavalry, so it was not surprising that they were beaten. Around mid-day on 15 May, Kaunitz launched an attack to recapture some positions on the south bank of the Sambre. After three hours of skirmishing and artillery duels, the thwarted Austrian general withdrew his forces.

== Battle ==
=== Preparations ===
On 16 May, Saint-Just and La Bas called a council of war at Desjardin's headquarters which was attended by Pichegru, Charbonnier, Jean Baptiste Kléber and Barthélemy Louis Joseph Schérer. Outraged by seeing French soldiers fleeing from the recent battlefield, the two political operatives published a broadside announcing that cowards and malingerers would be shot. Probably trying to limit future damage caused by Charbonnier's ineptitude, Pichegru drafted an order declaring that the Brabant Expedition would form a single army corps subject to the orders of Desjardin, Charbonnier, Kléber and Schérer. The last two would act as Desjardin's deputies, each leading two divisions.

Jacob was replaced in command of his division by Jean Adam Mayer. The Army of the Ardennes was reorganized so that Mayer's division had seven battalions and one regiment of cavalry, Marceau's division had nine battalions three cavalry regiments and Jean Thomas Guillaume Lorge's detached Flankers of the Right had six battalions and one cavalry regiment. Jean-Joseph Ange d'Hautpoul arrived from Capelle with three light cavalry regiments, to which a fourth was added to create an advanced guard. Four regiments of heavy cavalry were grouped into a reserve and assigned to Guillaume Soland.

At this time Prince Coburg warned his wing commander that the main army was moving in the direction of Tournai and that Kaunitz must act strictly on the defensive. On 18 May 1794, Coburg and his 74,000-strong army were defeated in the Battle of Tourcoing by the 82,000-man left wing of the Army of the North, led by Souham in the absence of Pichegru. This was followed on 22 May by the Battle of Tournay in which Coburg defeated Pichegru's attacks. Kaunitz deployed an outpost line along the north bank of the Sambre with Prince Heinrich XV of Reuss-Plauen in charge of the left and Paul Davidovich directing the right. Aware of the large numerical superiority of the French, the Austrian wing commander issued orders to be carried out in case a retreat was necessary.

=== 21 May combat ===
On the evening of 19 May, Prince Reuss passed along intelligence that the French were going to launch an offensive the following day. At 4:00 am Kaunitz directed all outposts east of Erquelinnes to fall back to the main defenses in time to avoid being cut off. These orders resulted in weak resistance to the French advance on 20 May. Hautpoul's advance guard crossed at Lobbes and moved northwest to Bonne-Espérance Abbey, facing Binche. Fromentin also crossed at Lobbes and moved west past Bienne-lez-Happart in two brigade columns, with Guillaume Philibert Duhesme on the right and Jean Froissard on the left. The division followed the retreating Coalition forces through the abandoned village of Péchant (Peissant) until it was facing the entrenched Grand-Reng camp. Muller's division crossed and advanced west through Merbes-Sainte-Marie on Fromentin's left. Finally, Despeaux's division and Soland's cavalry reserve crossed and took position in a second line behind Muller and Fromentin. Mayer's division took position near Bonne-Espérance Abbey on Fromentin's right. Watching Charleroi were Marceau's division at Leernes north of the Sambre and Lorge's brigade at Montigny-le-Tilleul on the south bank. During the day Desjardins asked Marceau to become part of his staff and Vezú took over his division. It rained hard that evening.

The French positions being unfortified, Kaunitz ordered his right wing under Davidovich to assault the French along the Erquelinnes road. At the same time Franz von Werneck with six battalions and two squadrons was to march up from Villers-Sire-Nicole in the rear to turn Desjardin's left flank. The attack started at 8:00 am on 21 May along the entire front. After an artillery bombardment the Austrian cavalry moved forward near Binche but were brought to a halt by Hautpoul's troopers. Covered by intense cannon-fire, Werneck's column surprised the French, who abandoned Erquelinnes. Kléber was soon on the spot, ordering Soland's cavalry into action and sending three battalions under André Poncet to recapture Erquelinnes. Muller's division had been deployed with Joseph Léonard Richard brigade in front of Poncet's. Soland's horsemen were driven off but Poncet formed his men into battalion columns and charged into the teeth of artillery fire, repulsing Werneck's cavalry and recapturing Erquelinnes. By 3:00 pm when Despeaux's division entered the fight, the Austrian attack had lost its momentum. During the afternoon, the Maubeuge commandant Jean Dominique Favereau sent a 2,000-man French column to attack Assevent as a diversion. This force lost 10 killed and 80 wounded in the skirmish.

During the struggle, Duhesme pointed out to Kléber that the Austrian left flank was weak and suggested an attack. Kléber brought the idea to Desjardin, but that general declined to directly order Mayer's division to advance because it belonged to the Army of the Ardennes. Desjardin felt that he had to send the orders through Charbonnier, but that general was too far away for the return instructions to reach Mayer in time. On 19 May Charbonnier had sent a note warning Desjardin that Mayer would only obey orders coming from his own army commander. He was reluctant to follow the orders of Pichegru to cooperate with the right wing of the Army of the North and still considered himself an independent commander. He was also focused on Charleroi which he believed was held by 8,000 enemies. On 21 May Charbonnier was near Fontaine-l'Evêque rounding up livestock for his army's use.

=== 24 May combat ===
On 22 May, the French busily fortified their positions facing Kaunitz's corps. Desjardin got artillery ammunition from the magazines at Maubeuge, while Charbonnier's army accumulated four days of rations at Thuin. At about this time Montaigu assumed command of Despeaux's division. On the 23rd a council of war decided to send Kléber and 15,000 men on a foraging raid north to Nivelles. This force was composed of nine battalions of elite troops under Poncet and Duhesme drawn from the Army of the North plus Hautpoul's four light cavalry regiments. The Army of the Ardennes contributed 4,000 men to the force, including two battalions of light infantry, the 20th Chasseurs à Cheval and the grenadier companies from Vezú and Mayer's divisions. Despite these plans, Charbonnier remained fixated on Charleroi. He planned to bring up three heavy cannons and two mortars to bombard the place on the 24th.

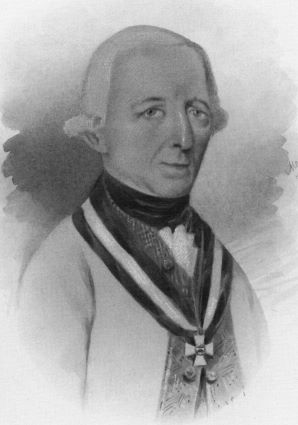
Peter Quosdanovich

While the French planned to bombard Charlerloi or launch a cattle raid, Kaunitz determined to attack the French on 24 May. The Austrian general had 29 1/3 battalions, five companies and 40 squadrons at his disposal, which were divided into five attack columns and a reserve. Franz Vincenz von Hoditz's 1st Column was made up of three battalions, one company, eight squadrons and four position guns. The 2nd Column under Peter Vitus von Quosdanovich had six battalions, 12 squadrons and 12 position guns. Davidovich's 3rd Column consisted of six battalions, one company, six squadrons and 12 position guns. The 4th Column led by Prince Reuss counted five battalions, two companies, five squadrons and seven position guns. Johann Gottfried von Schröder's 5th Column was composed of 5 1/3 battalions, one company, five squadrons and two position guns. The all-Dutch Reserve, made up of four battalions and four squadrons, was positioned at Bray, to the northwest of Binche. The position guns were deployed in batteries while the more numerous line guns were distributed to the infantry battalions.

The Coalition columns were numbered from south to north. The 2nd Column was directed against Erquelinnes with the 1st Column guarding its right flank. After taking the village it would move east along the Sambre, capturing the bridges. Kaunitz ordered the 3rd Column to advance toward Lobbes, but if the French tried to move toward Binche, it would swing to its left, attacking their enemies from the rear. The 4th Column was to pass Péchant on its right, occupying the village with light infantry, and also head in the direction of Lobbes. The 5th Column would keep an eye on the French right flank and protect the Reserve. To divert the attention of the French in Maubeuge, Maximilian Anton Karl, Count Baillet de Latour made a false attack against Boussois at day-break with one battalion, one 12-pound cannon and two squadrons each of Austrian Chevau-légers and Dutch cavalry.

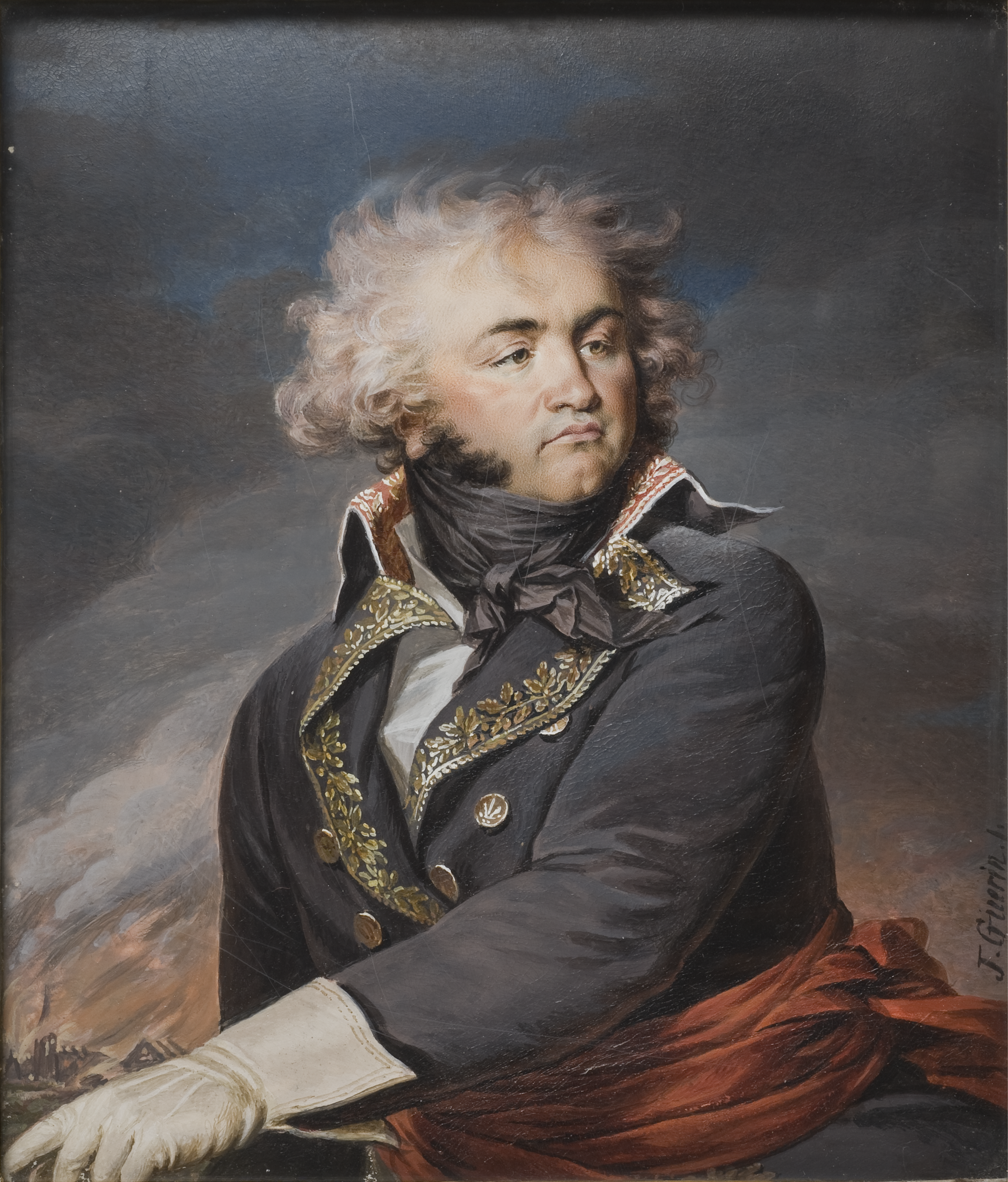
Jean Baptiste Kléber

At 2:30 am, the Coalition columns advanced to the attack. Hoditz's 1st Column occupied Grand-Reng then Jeumont. Covered by an early morning fog, Kaunitz's men took the French completely by surprise. Quosdanovich's 2nd Column and Davidovich's 3rd Column easily overran the redoubts guarding Erquelinnes and broke into the village. The divisions of Montaigu and Muller quickly retreated to the south bank of the Sambre, the former taking up a position between Solre-le-Sambre and Buissière while the latter organized a line between Buissière and Pommeroeul Wood. Aside from seizing much of Muller's artillery, the Austrians captured many French fugitives who got lost in the woods.

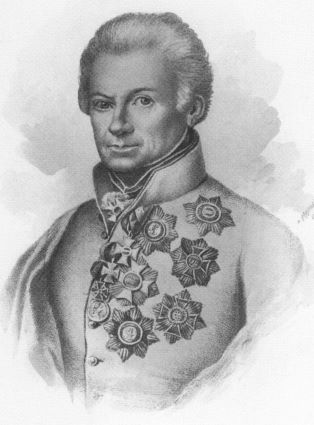
Prince Reuss

The 4th Column of Reuss also surprised the French near Péchant. The French pickets were captured and the fortifications were reached without a shot being fired. Many soldiers of Fromentin's division were killed or captured in their beds while the survivors took to their heels. Asleep in a farmhouse when the attack began, the division's generals were unable to react to the situation. Lacking orders to retreat, two line and one light battalions on the division's right flank were surrounded and forced to surrender. Reuss's column advanced toward Lobbes but he was unable to get to the bridge because he bumped into Kléber's force which had countermarched. That morning Kléber was near Anderlues when he heard Kaunitz's cannon. Scouting toward the battlefield, he discovered evidence of the disaster. Immediately, Kléber turned his force around and headed for Lobbes where he found the wreckage of Fromentin's division retreating, covered by a single intact battalion. Kléber's soldiers formed a line blocking the Austrians from further pursuit. There was a stiff fight between the troops of Kléber and Reuss near Bienne-lez-Hapart during which Mayer's division escaped.

Schröder's 5th Column started marching through Binche at 8:00 am and soon discovered French troops near Bonne-Espérance Abbey. This was Mayer's division, now isolated. Schröder detached Wilhelm Lothar Maria von Kerpen to outflank the French, while he pushed ahead toward Anderlues. The French fell back without fighting to Mont-Sainte-Geneviève where Kerpen discovered them somewhat later and asked for assistance. Schröder sent a detachment of Barco Hussars to dislodge the French, but they were gone when the hussars arrived. In the evening, the 5th Column reunited in front of Fontaine-l'Evêque where Schröder found the tail of Kléber's retreating column and scattered it. The spoils included a convoy of provisions collected by Kléber's foraging parties.

== Results ==
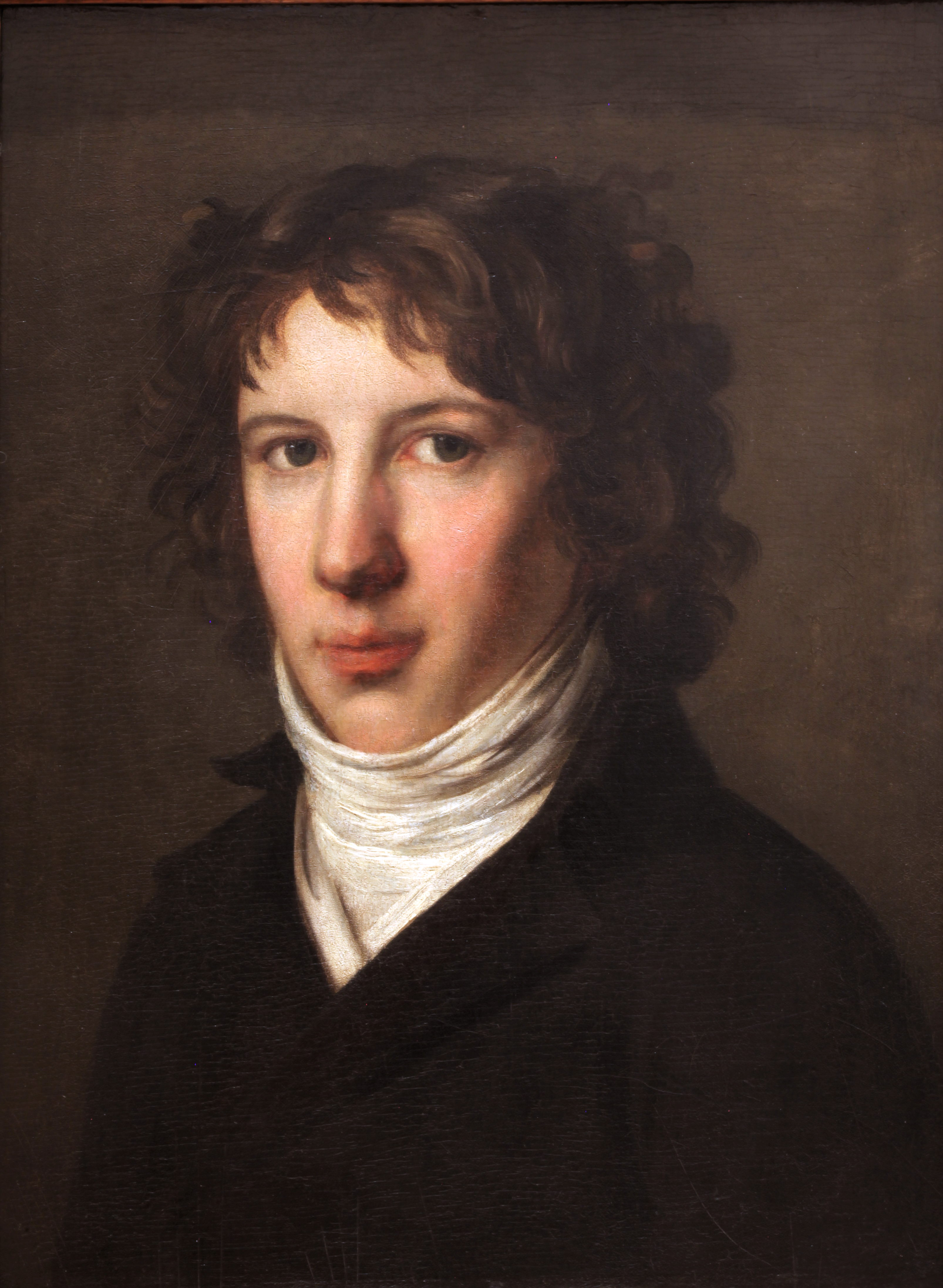
Louis Saint-Just

After withdrawing to the south bank of the Sambre, Mayer's division took position between Thuin and Aulnes Abbey while Vezú's division lined the river between the abbey and Montigny-le-Tilleul. The cavalry of Hautpoul and Soland reassembled south of Villère Wood. Desjardin admitted losing 30 cannons and 3,000 men, mostly prisoners, estimating that his foes only lost about 500 men. In fact, Kaunitz reported five officers, 23 non-commissioned officers and 583 soldiers were casualties. One authority estimated that the French suffered losses of 3,000 killed and wounded plus 2,400 men, 32 guns, 40 ammunition wagons and three colors captured out of 30,000 engaged. Coalition losses were given as 400 killed and wounded and 250 captured out of 24,000 engaged. Yet another source listed French casualties as 4,000 men and 25 guns.

I was dismayed. I did not know whom to reproach for operations so badly arranged. I did not see the shadow of treason, but the incapacity of the leaders was flagrant.

— René Levasseur

Kaunitz ordered Schröder to clear the French from Lobbes, Thuin and Aulnes Abbey on the 25th. For this purpose, his lieutenant was reinforced to a strength of six battalions, 12 squadrons, 12 heavy cannons and 10 howitzers. Schröder found the French holding the bridge at Aulnes Abbey in great strength and declined to attack. On the afternoon of 26 May his force crossed downstream at Marchienne-au-Pont and took up a nearby position on the south bank. The French soldiers were shoeless, hungry, tired and discouraged. The generals and representatives held a gloomy council of war at Thuin on 26 May. During the meeting, Saint-Just abruptly cut off further discussion by announcing, "Make a victory for the republic tomorrow: choose a siege or a battle!"

The French were drubbed again at the Battle of Gosselies on 3 June. Under Jourdan they were beaten a fourth time at the Battle of Lambusart on 16 June. The epic Battle of Fleurus was fought on 26 June in which the French finally emerged victorious.
