= 1798 in Belgium =

- Decades
- See also: Other events of 1798; List of years in Belgium

Events in the year 1798 in the Belgian Departments of France. The French First Republic had annexed the Austrian Netherlands and Prince-bishopric of Liège (predecessor states of modern Belgium) in 1795 and had reorganised the territory as the nine departments Dyle, Escaut (department), Forêts, Jemmape, Lys, Meuse-Inférieure, Deux-Nèthes, Ourthe, and Sambre-et-Meuse.

The year 1798 corresponds to the period from 12 Nivôse of Year VI to 11 Nivôse of Year VII in the French Republican Calendar.

== Incumbents ==
Directors – Paul Barras, Louis Marie de La Révellière-Lépeaux, Jean-François Rewbell, Philippe-Antoine Merlin de Douai, François de Neufchâteau (until 20 May), Jean Baptiste Treilhard (from 20 May)

== Events ==
- Over the course of the year Lieven Bauwens made numerous trips to England, smuggling out spinning machinery a piece at a time.

September

- 5 September – French legislature passes Law of 19 Fructidor, Year VI instituting universal conscription of all unmarried men aged 20 to 25.

October

- 12 October – beginning of the Peasants' War (Boerenkrijg) in Flanders and Brabant.
- 22 October – short-lived liberation of Mechelen from French rule.
- 24 October – attempted British landing at Blankenberge fails.

December

- 5 December – Decisive defeat of Peasant Army near Hasselt.

== Publications ==
- Charles Oudiette, Le Département de la Dyle, ou Première partie du dictionnaire géographique et topographique, des neuf départemens de la Belgique (Brussels, Armand Gaborria, 1798)

== Deaths ==
- 24 June – Maria Christina, Duchess of Teschen (born 1742), former governess general of the Austrian Netherlands
- 21 August – Cornelius Franciscus Nelis (born 1736), bishop of Antwerp.
