= Fontaine-Valmont =

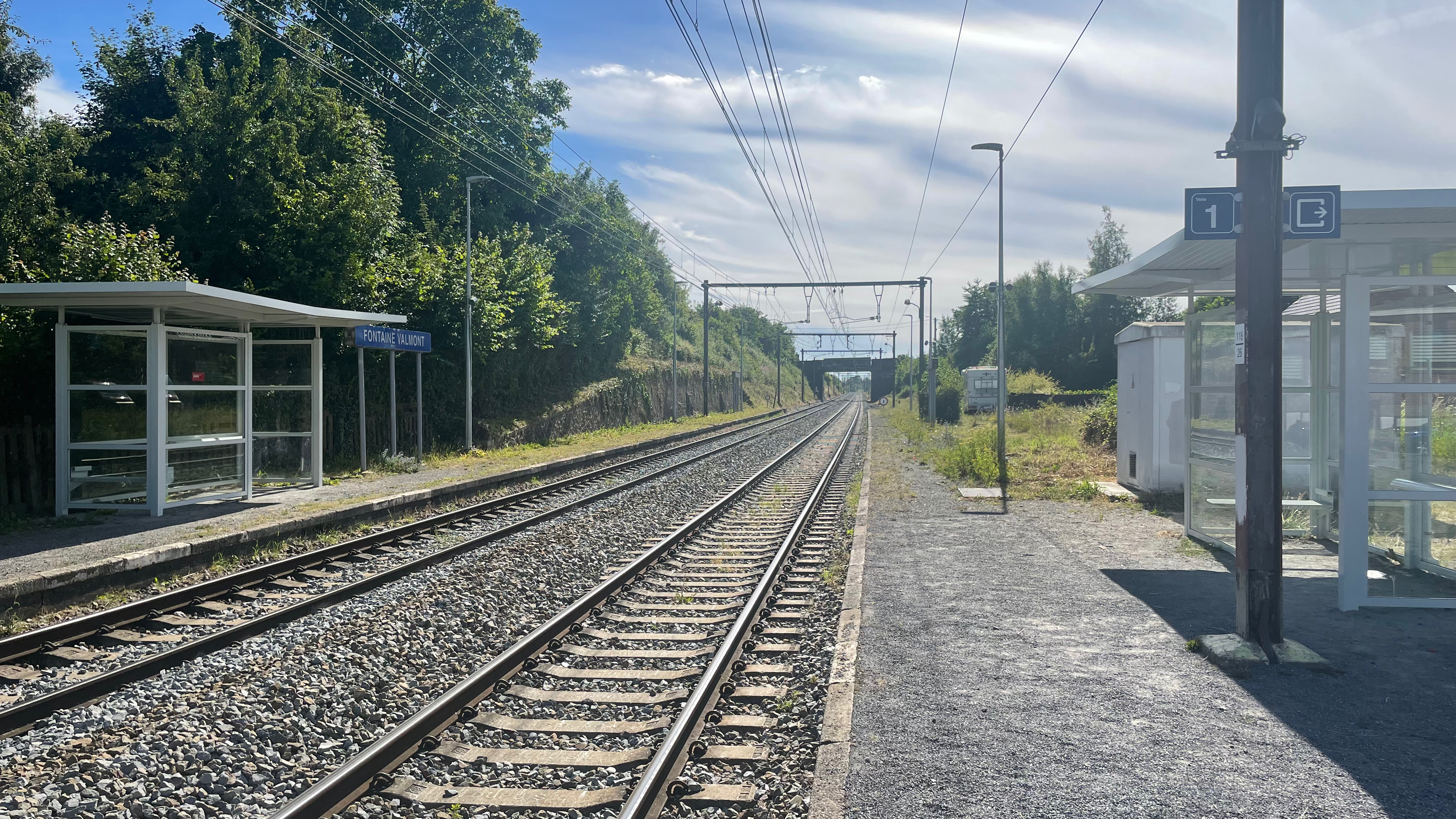
- Fontaine-Valmont railway station

- Location within Belgium Location within Europe
- Coordinates: 50°19′13″N 04°12′50″E
- Country: Belgium
- Region: Wallonia
- Province: Hainaut
- Municipality: Merbes-le-Château

Fontaine-Valmont is a village and district of the municipality of Merbes-le-Château, located in the Hainaut Province in Wallonia, Belgium.

The village has been known since at least 868, when it was known as Fontanas. In 1096 it was gifted to the Prince-Bishopric of Liège, and later donated to Aulne Abbey. Traditionally, the village was known for its good horse breeding traditions. The Neo-Gothic village church dates from 1892, and replaced an earlier church from the 14th century.
