= Battle of Gosselies =

Battle of the War of the First Coalition

Coordinates: 50°24′N 4°26′E

- Part of War of the First Coalition
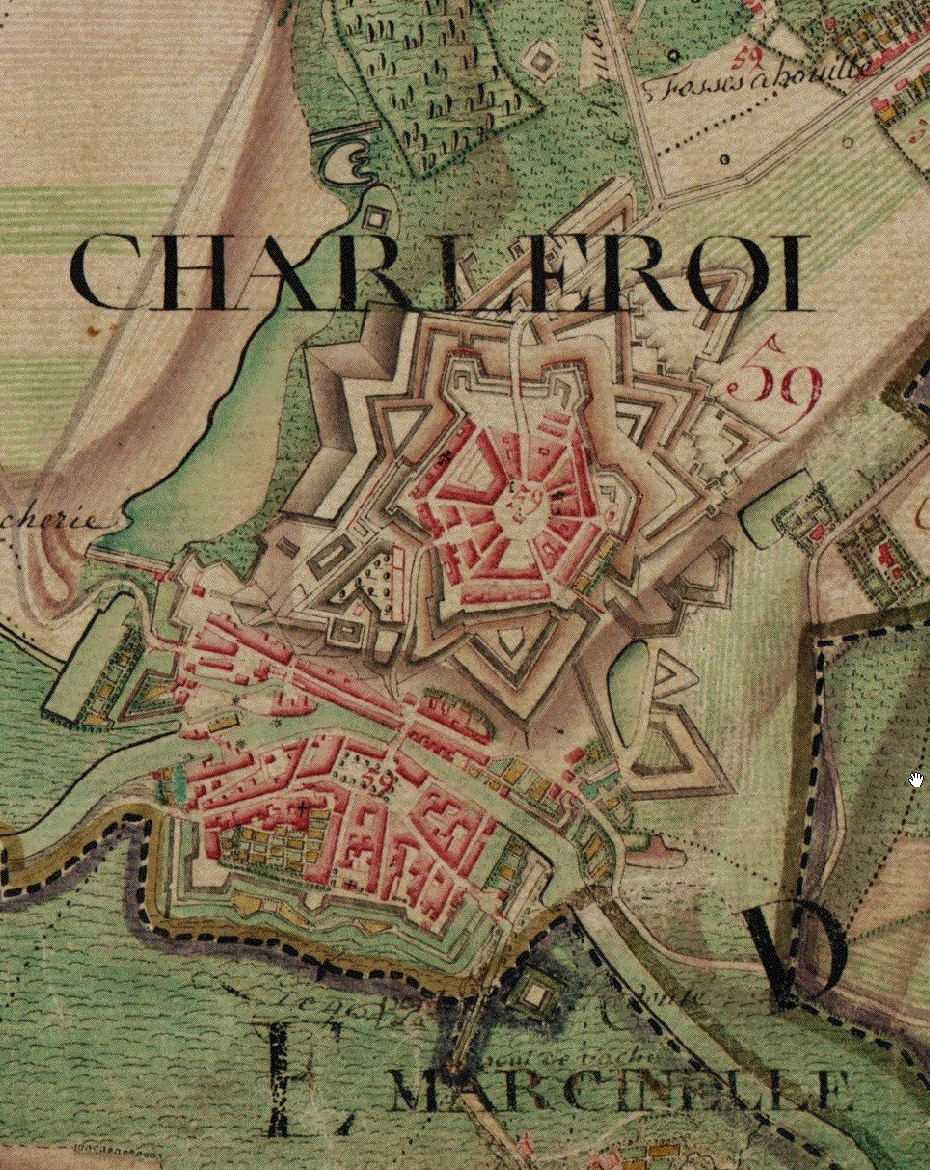
- Map of the Charleroi fortress by Joseph de Ferraris
Date	3 June 1794
Location	Gosselies, Belgium
Result	Austro-Dutch victory

Belligerents
Dutch Republic (Habsburg monarchy) Habsburg Austria	Republican France

Commanders and leaders
(Dutch Republic) Prince of Orange	(France) Jacques Desjardin (France) Louis Charbonnier

Strength
33,500	37–40,000

Casualties and losses
424	2,000, 1 gun

The Battle of Gosselies or Battle of Charleroi (3 June 1794) saw a Republican French army co-commanded by Jacques Desjardin and Louis Charbonnier try to cross the Sambre River against a joint Dutch and Habsburg Austrian army under William, Hereditary Prince of Orange. The French defeat in the battle marked the third of five attempts by their armies to win a foothold on the north bank of the Sambre during the War of the First Coalition. In 1794, Gosselies was a separate village but is now part of the Charleroi municipality, about 7 kilometres (4 mi) north of the city center. Charleroi is located about 60 kilometres (37 mi) south of Brussels.

The spring of 1794 saw bitter fighting in the Austrian Netherlands as the numerically superior French armies mounted continual attacks against the forces of the First Coalition. In trying to cross the Sambre, the French were beaten at Grandreng on 13 May and Erquelinnes on 24 May. Nevertheless, the French recrossed the Sambre on the 26th and laid siege to Charleroi on 30 May. After their defeat and withdrawal on 3 June, the French would make one more failed attempt to cross the Sambre at Lambusart on 16 June before they triumphed in the Battle of Fleurus on 26 June 1794.

== Background ==
=== General strategic objectives ===
In 1794, General Charles Pichegru, in command of the French Army of the North and Army of the Ardennes charged with conquering the Austrian Netherlands (modern Belgium), decided to launch offensives against the flanks of the allied army under the overall command of Prince Frederick Josias of Saxe-Coburg-Saalfeld. While Pichegru led the attack in the west personally, he directed the right wing of the Army of the North, under General of Division Jacques Desjardin, and the Army of the Ardennes, under General Louis Charbonnier, to cross the Sambre, defeat the Austrian left wing under Kaunitz, and capture Mons. However, he did not appoint an overall commander for this force, resulting in a divided leadership driven by Charbonnier's incompetence, jealousy and refusal to cooperate with Desjardins.

=== Two failed attempts ===
Prior to the battle of Gosselies, Desjardin and Charbonnier had already crossed the Sambre and been defeated twice, once at the battle of Grand-Reng, and subsequently in the battle of Erquelinnes. After Erquelinnes, the French leaders decided to give up on trying to defeat the allied army or attempt to capture Mons immediately after crossing, and instead capture Charleroi first to secure their rear and obtain a base on which to anchor further movements. The reasons for this were manyfold:

- The area between Charleroi and Grand-Reng/Erquelinnes had been foraged clean, and could not support further campaigning against Kaunitz's army without building up supply bases, a time-consuming and logistically difficult task
- Charleroi's capture would grant the French a fortified supply base across the Sambre, and control over its lower reaches
- The Army of the Ardennes on the right flank especially could be more easily supplied from their bases in Philippeville, Givet and Rocroi
- Moving eastwards towards Charleroi would also bring the army closer to General Jourdan's left wing of the Army of the Moselle, which had already been marching towards Namur on its own campaign objective, but will be specifically ordered on 30 May to reinforce Desjardins and Charbonnier

== Order of Battle ==
=== The French ===
The French forces were composed of two major groups: The right wing of the Army of the North under Desjardins formed an advance guard under General Marceau, as well as four divisions under Generals Muller, Fromentin, Montaigu, and Ferrand, and cavalry reserve brigades under General Soland. The Army of the Ardennes under Charbonnier comprised two divisions under Generals Vézu and Mayer.

The forces earmarked for the attack on Charleroi were Fromentin's division, the cavalry, as well as Charbonnier's divisions. Ferrand, Montaigu and Muller's divisions were to guard the right bank of the Sambre from Maubeuge to Landelies, from which point eastward would be the battlezone.

=== Coalition forces ===
Prince Kaunitz's total force was outnumbered by the French forces, and consisted of units under Generals Hoditz, Quasdanovich, Davidovich, Prince Reuss, Wartensleben and Schröder, together with other detachments and brigades, largely in the positions where they stopped after the battle of Erquelinnes.

== The 1st Siege of Charleroi ==
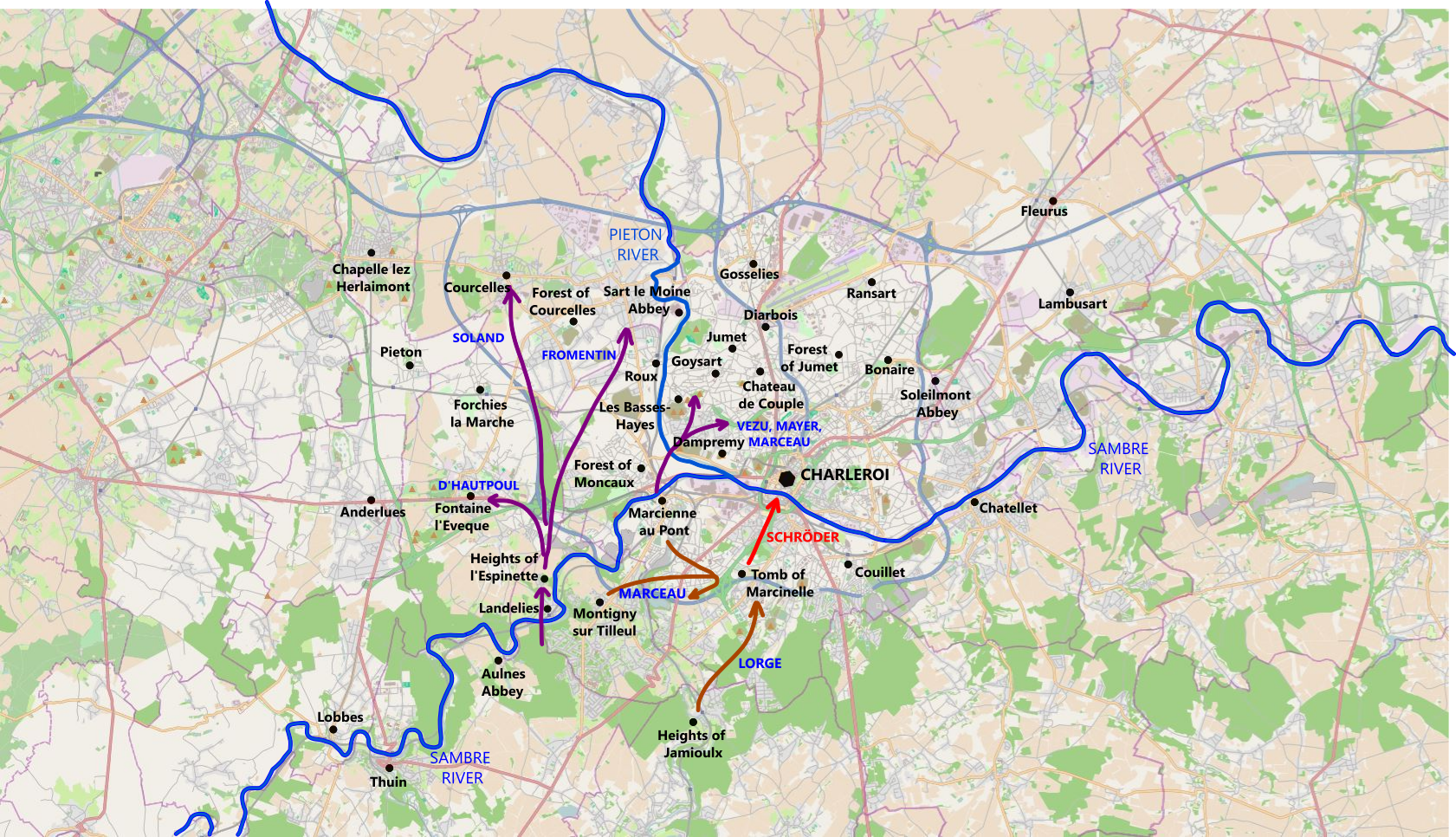
The French crossing of the Sambre on 27–28 May, with the attack on the Allied camp at Marcinelle on the 27th (brown), the withdrawal of Schroder (red) and the actual Sambre crossings on the 28th (purple)

=== 27 May: Securing the right bank of the Sambre ===
Spirce:

Aware that the enemy had an entrenched camp at the tomb of Marcinelle under the command of Schröder, on the French side of the Sambre in front of Charleroi (today near the intersection of Rue Hoyas and Rue de la Tombe in the Charleroi district of Marcinelle), Marceau's vanguard, Vézu's division and Lorge's brigade of Mayer's division were ordered to drive the allies out and across the Sambre to secure the right bank prior to the French crossing to the left bank . Marceau's frontal attack from Montigny-le-Tilleul and Marchienne-au-Pont was repulsed when Vézu's division got lost and failed to come up in time to support the attack and it was enfiladed by artillery fire from Wartensleben's unit on the heights of l'Espinette (near modern Rue de l'Espinette, north of Landelies), but Lorge's attack from the heights of Jamioulx (north of modern-day Odrimont) made progress and threatened to cut Schröder off from retreat.

Threatened by Lorge's advance, Schröder decided to withdraw to join Wartensleben on the heights of L'Espinette, and commenced his movement at 10 am on 28 May. The right bank of the Sambre was now clear of enemies, and the French were free to cross the Sambre.

=== 28 May: The French cross the Sambre for the third time ===
Marceau occupied Schröder's camp after its evacuation, and advanced to Marchienne-au-Pont, but found the bridge there well defended by allies on the left bank. At the same time, Fromentin's division crossed the Sambre at Landelies and attacked the heights of L'Espinette. Having arrived at L'Espinette after his withdrawal, Schröder prepared to counterattack Fromentin and defend the heights when the order arrived from Kaunitz to withdraw all his forces westward to the main Allied position at Rouveroy. Schröder complied, but sent a detachment under Kerpen to Fontaine l'Eveque to watch the enemy.

After Schröder's second withdrawal, Fromentin advanced to a position facing north between the forest of Courcelles (south of modern Souvret and Wilbeau-Roux) and the bridge across the Piéton (now part of the Brussels-Charleroi Canal) at Roux. On Fromentin's left, Soland's cavalry brigade advanced to Courcelles itself. General d'Hautpoul's cavalry of Marceau's advance guard also crossed at Landelies and marched for Fontaine l'Eveque, reaching it before Kerpen's detachment and forcing Kerpen to bypass it and withdraw further north to Chapelle-lez-Herlaimont.

Duhesme's infantry of Marceau's vanguard, meanwhile, had driven the defenders of the bridge at Marchienne-au-Pont off, crossed over to the left bank, and taken station in the forest of Moncaux (now the Charleroi suburb of Le Bougnou). Vézu's division advanced to positions between Duhesme and Fromentin. Mayer's division, which was meant to cross east of Duhesme, was unable to do so due to flooding and crossed at Marchienne-au-Pont instead, taking position behind Duhesme.

To all this Kaunitz offered no further resistance. Being conscious of his numerical inferiority, and aware of allied forces being despatched to reinforce him by Coburg, Kaunitz decided to defend his main positions at Rouveroy and Pieton (north of modern Anderlues), protect Nivelles and Brussels by holding Seneffe with Schröder's forces, and leave Charleroi to defend itself until he was reinforced and able to relieve the siege by giving battle.

=== 29 May: The first siege of Charleroi begins ===
Left unopposed, the French spent the 29th getting their forces into position to invest Charleroi, commencing the first siege of the city.

- Furthest left, Fromentin's division moved to take position between Les Basses-Hayes (today the Charleroi suburb of Bassee) to Goysart (the modern suburb of Coupe).
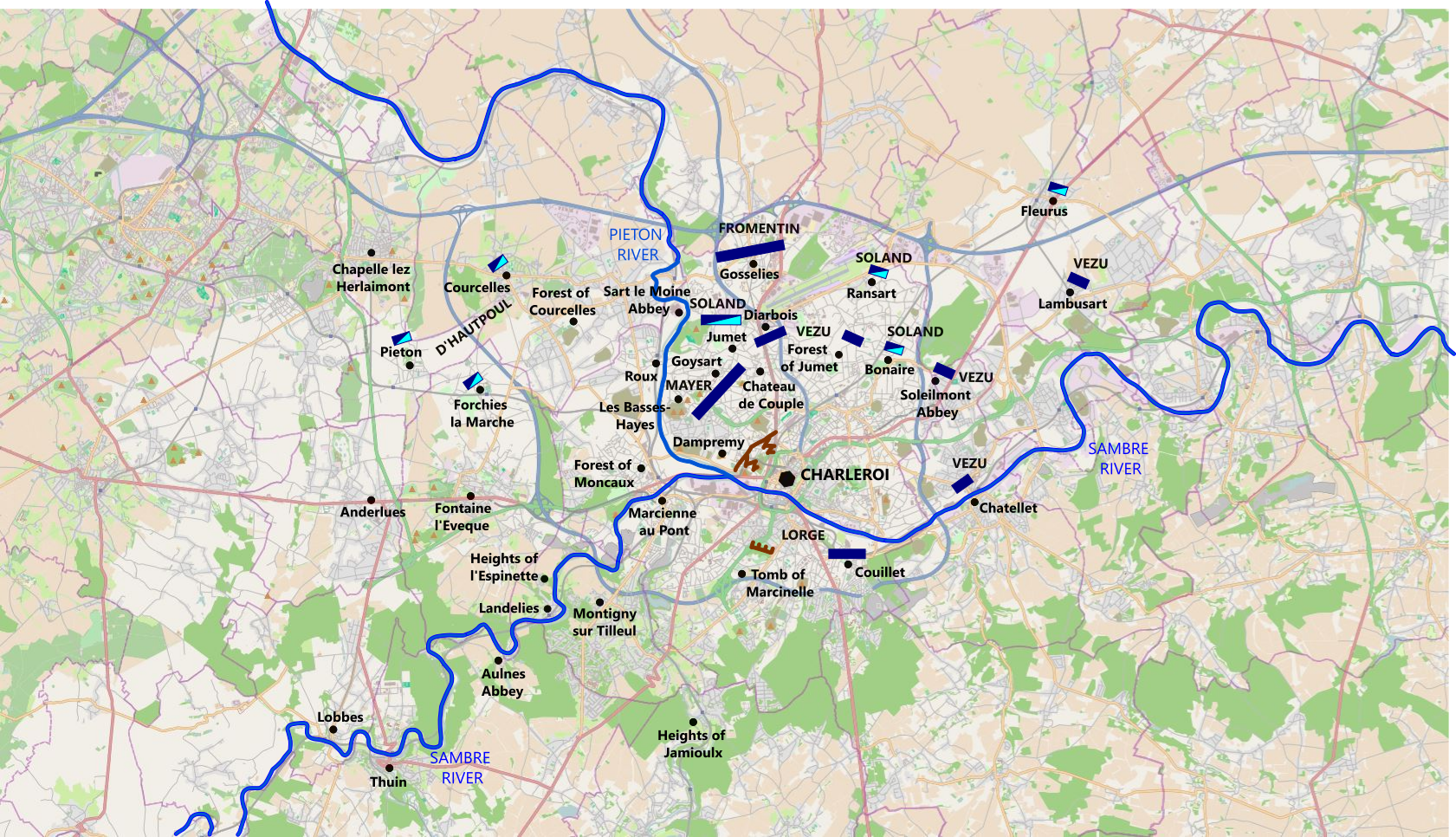
- Map of the short-lived first siege of Charleroi, with the positions of the French siege works (brown) and covering army (dark blue) on 1 June, just before the battle of Gosselies. Cavalry units are marked with blue slashes.
  Mayer's division continued the line eastwards from Goysart to the Chateau de Couple (near modern Rue Surlet).
- From Mayer's right, Vézu's division extended to Diarbois (near the Rue du Diarbois), with further detachments spread out around the eastern perimeter of Charleroi fortress in the forest of Jumet (east of Houbois), Soleilmont Abbey, Lambusart, and Chatellet, the latter to link up with Lorge's brigade, now stationed in Couillet, east of Le Tombe. In military terms, Vézu's division was badly overstretched and thinned out, though the French were expecting an attack from further west.
- The cavalry meanwhile occupied plains where they could operate with effect against any attacker, with Soland crossing the Piéton at Sart-les-Moine Priory (today south of the canal locks west of Gosselies), and stationing his brigade at Jumet (the modern suburb of Saint-Ghislain), with outposts at Ransart, Bonaire (now Bois-Noel) and Fleurus. d'Hautpoul's cavalry of the advance guard advanced to occupy Courcelles, Forches (modern Forchies-la-Marche) and Piéton.
- The siege force, consisting of rotating duty battalions from each of the divisions and commanded by chief of staff General Tharreau, prepares to dig the siege parallels from Dampremy, to the west of Charleroi fortress.

=== 30 May – 1 June: The allies get into position to counterattack ===
While the French were getting into position to begin their siege of Charleroi, Emperor Francis II of Austria had arrived at Rouveroy in person from the west with Coburg and reinforcements, to assemble and supervise a counterattack. Unimpressed by Kaunitz, and for political reasons, Francis appointed the Prince of Orange over his head to lead the allied left wing, with General Alvinczi as chief of staff. This prompted Kaunitz to resign in protest.

The allied plan was to assemble a force of 33,500 men drawn from the forces of Orange, 5,100 men from the unit of General Riese at Namur (who had been ordered to march to Sombreffe), and other forces ordered to the theatre from other sectors by Coburg, and to attack from the north and overwhelm the spread-out French right on 3 June.

These were divided into 4 columns, whose initial march orders were issued this day:

1. Latour's column: Commanded by Count Latour, this was built around forces in Chapelle-lez-Herlaimont, and was meant to guard the right flank of the eventual allied attack.
2. Werneck's column: Led by General Werneck, this was to advance up the Nivelles highway from the base at Rouveroy to its staging point around the hermitage of Sept Douleurs (today Eglise Notre Dame des Sept Douleurs, Nivelles).
3. Wartensleben's column: This was to follow Werneck's column, but turn off the Nivelles highway further east at Sainte-Ërnelle
4. Quasdanovich's column: This was to advance all the way to Sombreffe and incorporate Riese's unit.

On the French side, the 30th was spent surveying Charleroi and assessing the best mode of attack. The conclusion was that Charleroi was so well-manned, well-fortified and the fortifications so well-maintained that it could not be stormed. The leaders therefore gave the green light for a regular siege to commence, with the siege batteries positioned at Dampremy and in Marcinelle, near the tomb, beginning their bombardment on 31 May.

On 31 May also, following countless complaints about the divided command structure and the previous defeats, Charbonnier was finally relieved of command by the ruling Committee of Public Safety, and Desjardins given overall authority over Charbonnier's and his own divisions. However, conscious of his inexperience and inadequacy at commanding a force of this size, Desjardins immediately submitted a request to be replaced in command by a more experienced and suitable commander.

Meanwhile, becoming gradually aware that a major allied movement was underway, Desjardins ordered Poncet's brigade of Muller's division up from its position between Lobbes and the Abbey of Aulnes to reinforce the French covering army at Jumet, its position being filled by Richard's brigade of the same. Fromentin's division was also moved up northwards to Gosselies around this time. However, Desjardins did nothing to either reinforce the overstretched French right, or concentrate the army more effectively.

== Battle of Gosselies ==
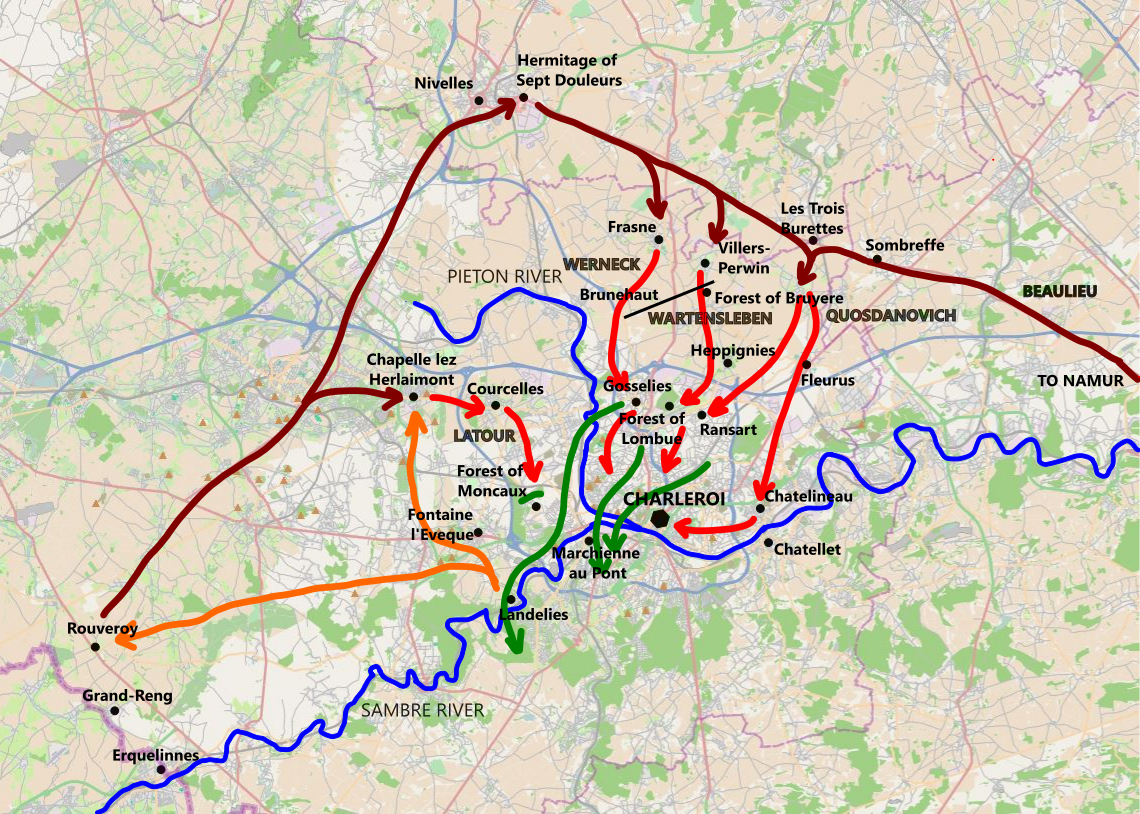
Map of the battle of Gosselies showing the withdrawal of the Allies from l'Espinette (orange), the Allied approach marches for the counterattack (dark red) and the attacks during the actual battle (lighter red). French retreat is shown in green.

=== 2 June: Final allied approach marches ===
At 3 am on 2 June, the four allied attack columns, now arrived and rested in their staging grounds, made their final approach marches to their jump-off points.

- Quasdanovich, furthest east, marched to the inn of Trois-Burettes (whose building still stands today as a liquor store at Chaussee de Namur 272)
- Wartensleben marched to Villers-Perwin
- Werneck marched to Frasne (modern Frasne-lez-Gosselies)
- Latour marched to Courcelles

The French made no changes to their dispositions, although the siege corps was instructed to stop work in anticipation of the impending attack.

=== 3 June: attack on Gosselies ===
At 3 am on the 3rd, the allies commenced their attack, which was focused on the town of Gosselies, which had been identified as the extreme right of the continuous French defences.

- Quasdanovich, at Trois-Burettes, split his column in two.
  - The eastern sub-column moved down the Fleurus road to capture Chatellet and cut the French retreat east of Charleroi
  - The western sub-column movedto attack Ransart and the forest of Lombue (now Bois-Lombut)
- Wartensleben, at Villers-Perwin, advanced on Gosselies from the east and northeast, via Heppignies and the forest of Lombue
- Werneck advanced on Gosselies from the northwest, via the Brunehaut (the remains of an ancient Roman road, northwest of modern Viesville and Thimeon).
- Latour captured Courcelles and Trazegnies, then waited to coordinate further advances with the main attack at Gosselies

After capturing Lambusart, Quasdanovich's column was halted by the forces stationed at Soleilmont, although his cavalry bypassed the battle at Chatelineau and reached Charleroi to support and relieve the garrison. However, the attack on Gosselies was a clear success, with Wartensleben breaking into Ransart and Werneck entering Gosselies itself, panicking Fromentin's division, which fled in disorder.

Comprehensively outflanked and beaten, Desjardins and Charbonnier sounded the retreat and directed the divisions to cross at Marchienne-au-Pont. Vezu's and Mayer's divisions, being in the second line, successfully made it across ahead of the Allied pursuers. However, Fromentin's division, in disorder and cut off from Marchienne by the allied advance from Gosselies, was forced to retreat the long way around by Landelies. Along the way, they were caught in the flank and savaged by Latour's column, attacking eastwards from Courcelles, and were only saved by Marceau's advance guard on the left wing, which attacked and held off the attackers in the forest of Moncaux and covered Fromentin's retreat.

After Fromentin reached Landelies, Marceau's forces then retired to the heights above the Abbey d'Aulnes to discourage pursuit and cover Fromentin's crossing until nightfall before crossing back to the right bank himself.

== Aftermath ==
The defeat at Gosselies left the French army demoralised and dejected.

In a search for scapegoats, Fromentin, who had fallen from his horse during the battle, was on that basis accused of having been drunk by the Representatives of the People Levasseur and Guyton, who were commissaries from the ruling Committee of Public Safety with supervisory powers over the army on the Sambre. Fromentin was stripped of general rank and reduced to the rank of private. However, his rank (but not his command) would be reinstated in July after successfully proving his fall was due to a starvation diet prescribed as treatment for haemorrhoids.

However, the defeat gave the allies no strategic gain, as Jourdan had actually arrived in the operational area on 1–2 June with his four divisions from the Army of the Moselle, though they were too late, too far and in too bad a condition at the time to join the battle at Gosselies. Jourdan's arrival brought the total number of French on the Sambre to nearly 100,000 men.

On 8 June, the Committee of Public Safety having taken into account Desjardin's request to be replaced in command, Jourdan was appointed to overall command of the Army of the North, Ardennes and Moselle forces thus assembled on the Sambre. Desjardins was assigned to command the forces in the Ardennes region, headquartered in Philippeville.

Meanwhile, the attention of Coburg and the allied command turned once more westwards, to where Pichegru was in the middle of the Siege of Ypres. Hoping to assemble a force to counter Pichegru, the allies did not capitalise on their victory here, but instead took the opportunity to siphon off forces towards Tournai, weakening Orange's corps on this wing.

Jourdan would attack across the Sambre a fourth time on 12 June, at the Battle of Lambusart.
