= Jemmape (department) =

Former French department (1795–1814)

Department of Jemmape Département de Jemmape (French)
- 1795–1814
- Location of Jemmape in France (1812)
- Status: Department of the French First Republic and the French First Empire
- Chef-lieu: Mons; 50°27′N 3°53′E
- Official languages: French
- Common languages: Dutch
- History
  - Creation: 1 October 1795
  - Treaty of Paris, disestablished: 30 May 1814

Area
- 1812: 3,766 km^{2} (1,454 sq mi)

Population
  - 1812: 472,366
Preceded by	Succeeded by
County of Hainault; Prince-Bishopric of Liège	Province of Hainault
- Today part of: Belgium

Jemmape (French pronunciation: [ʒɛmap]) was a department of the French First Republic and of the First French Empire in present-day Belgium. It was named after the Battle of Jemappes, fought between the French and the Austrians in 1792 near the village of Jemappes, near Mons. Jemappes was spelled Jemmape, Jemmapes or Jemmappes at the time. Its territory corresponded more or less with that of the Belgian province of Hainaut. It was firstly created on 2 March 1793, and then recreated on 1 October 1795, when the Austrian Netherlands and the Prince-Bishopric of Liège were officially annexed by the French Republic. Before annexation, its territory lay in the County of Hainaut, Tournai and the Tournaisis, the County of Namur (Charleroi) and the Bishopric of Liège (Thuin).

Jemappe within the northern French Empire (1811)

The Chef-lieu of the department was Mons. The department was subdivided into the following three arrondissements and cantons:

- Mons: Boussu, Chièvres, Dour, Enghien, Lens, Le Roeulx, Mons (2 cantons), Pâturages and Soignies.
- Charleroi: Beaumont, Binche, Charleroi (2 cantons), Chimay, Fontaine-l'Évêque, Gosselies, Merbes-le-Château, Seneffe and Thuin.
- Tournai: Antoing, Ath, Celles, Ellezelles, Frasnes, Lessines, Leuze, Péruwelz, Quevaucamps, Templeuve and Tournai (2 cantons).

After Napoleon was defeated in 1814, the department was dissolved and later it became part of the United Kingdom of the Netherlands as the province of Hainaut.

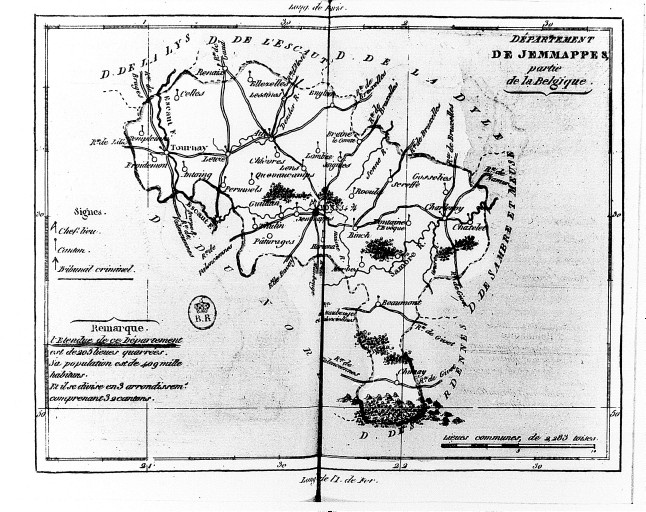
Map of the former Jemmape department

== Administration ==
=== Prefects ===
The Prefect was the highest state representative in the department.

Term start	Term end	Office holder
2 March 1800	1 February 1805	Jean-Baptiste Étienne Garnier
1 February 1805	7 August 1810	Patrice Charles Gislain De Coninck
7 August 1810	8 February 1812	Jean-Baptiste Maximilien Villot de Fréville
8 February 1812	9 March 1812	Benoît Joseph Holvoet
9 March 1812	30 May 1814	Pierre-Clément de Laussat

=== Secretaries-General ===
The Secretary-General was the deputy to the Prefect.

Term start	Term end	Office holder
2 March 1800	30 May 1814	Robert La Vallée

=== Subprefects of Charleroi ===
Term start	Term end	Office holder
26 April 1800	30 May 1814	Stanislas Joseph Troye

=== Subprefects of Mons ===
The office of Subprefect of Mons was held by the Prefect until 1811.

Term start	Term end	Office holder
14 January 1811	11 April 1811	Philibert François Jean Baptiste Joseph Vander Haegen de Mussain
11 April 1811	30 May 1814	Defraye de Schiplaecken

=== Subprefects of Tournai ===
Term start	Term end	Office holder
25 April 1800	3 February 1804	François Magloire Joseph Goblet
3 February 1804	30 May 1814	Nicolas Lahure
