= Merbes-Sainte-Marie =

Coordinates: 50.355823°N 4.171057°E

Merbes-Sainte-Marie (French pronunciation: [mɛʁb sɛ̃t maʁi]; Walloon: Miebe-Sinte-Mareye) is a village of Wallonia and a district of the municipality of Merbes-le-Château, located in the province of Hainaut, Belgium.
