= Johannes Baptista van Acker =

Flemish painter

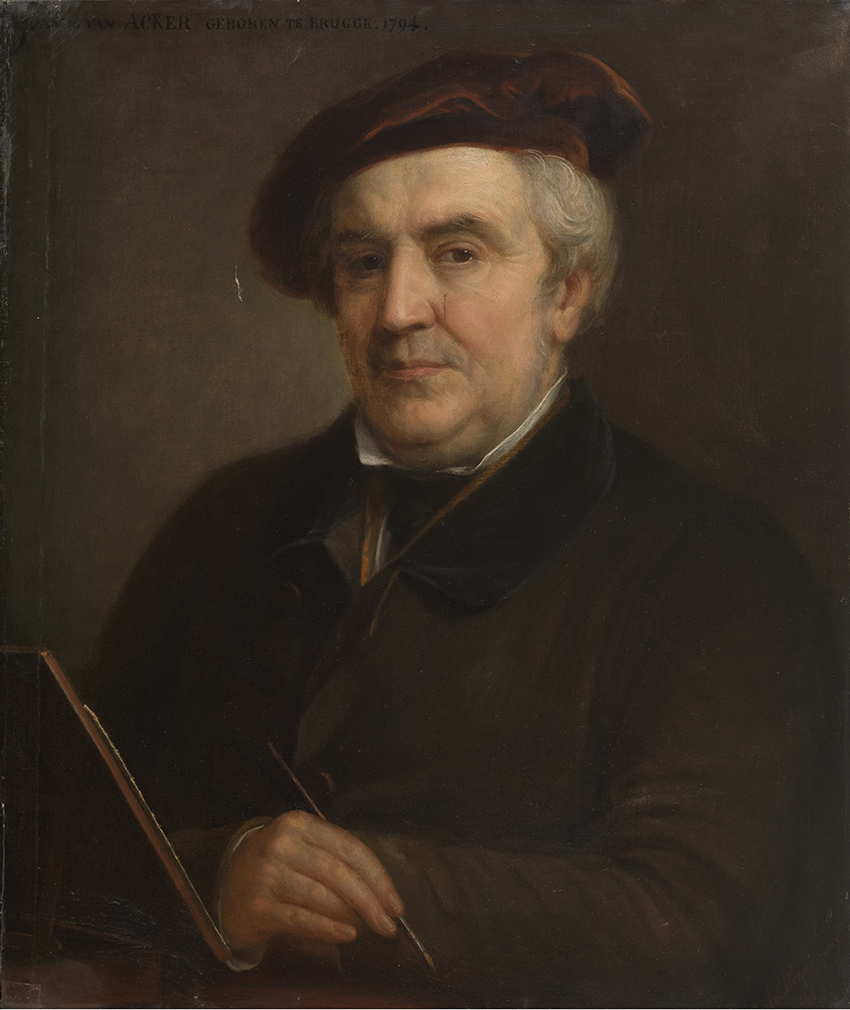
- Portrait of Johannes Van Acker, by Charles Picqué, collection Groeningemuseum
- Born: Johannes Baptista van Acker ca. 1794; Bruges, Belgium
- Died: ca. 1863; Bruges, Belgium
- Occupation: Painter

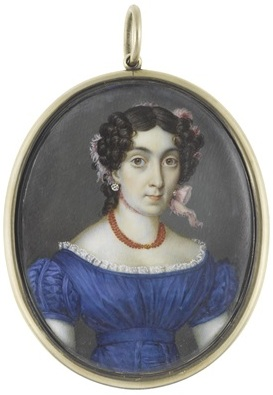
A lady wearing blue decollete

Johannes Baptista van Acker (1794–1863) was a Flemish painter.

Van Acker was born at Bruges. He studied under Ducq, and soon became popular as a miniature-painter. In 1834 he went to Paris, and was there acknowledged as one of the best artists of his class. After his return to Bruges, he was called by King Leopold to Brussels, and painted numerous miniatures of the royal family and personages of the court. After a journey to England, Van Acker returned to Bruges, where he died, in 1863.
