= Merbes-le-Château =

Municipality in Hainaut Province, Wallonia, Belgium

Merbes-le-Château Miebe (Walloon)
- Municipality
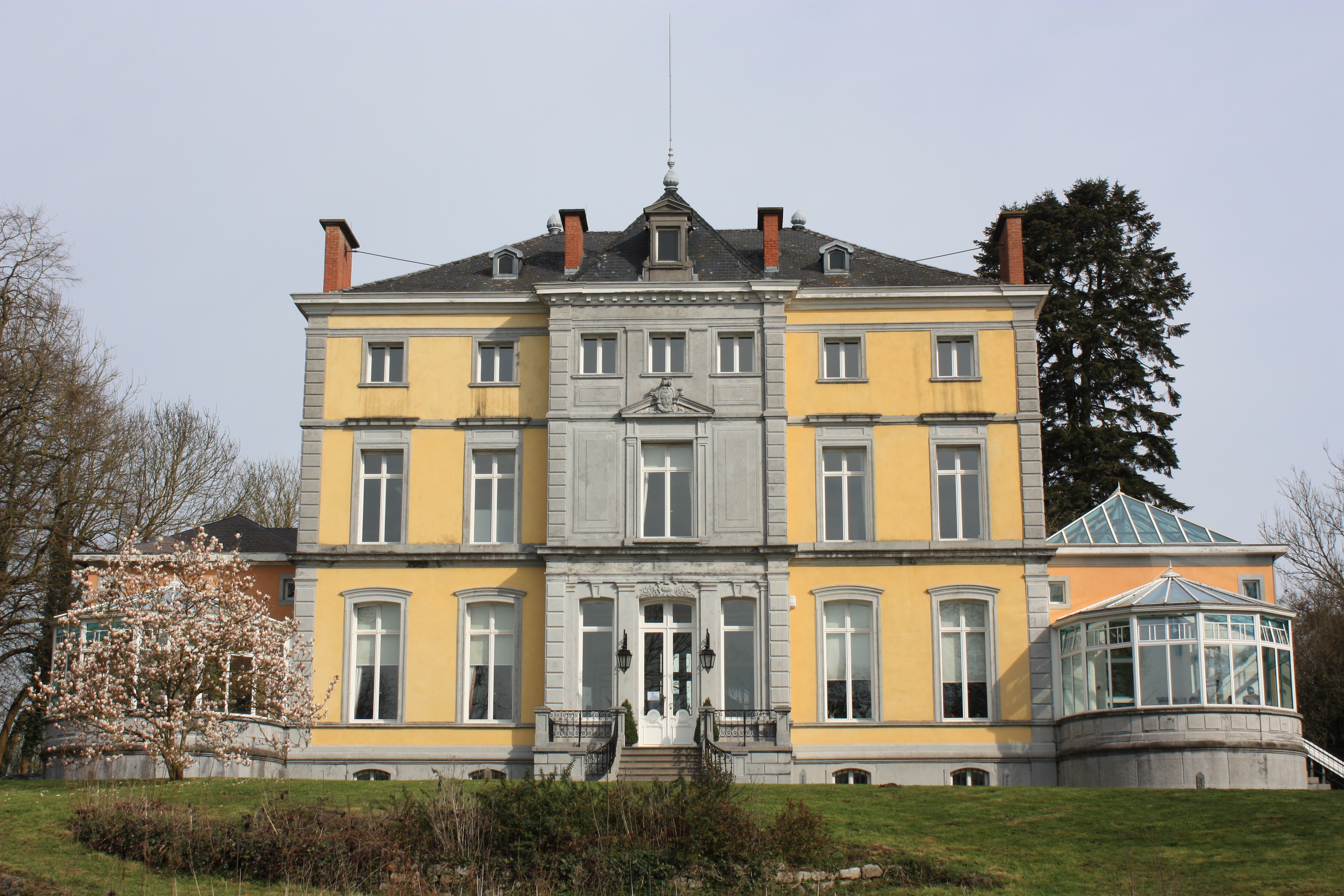
- town hall

- Flag Coat of arms

- Location of Merbes-le-Château in Hainaut
- Interactive map of Merbes-le-Château
- Location in Belgium
- Coordinates: 50.323724°N 4.165329°E
- Country: Belgium
- Community: French Community
- Region: Wallonia
- Province: Hainaut
- Arrondissement: Thuin

Government
  - Mayor: Philippe Lejeune (PS)
  - Governing party: PS

Area
  - Total: 30.53 km^{2} (11.79 sq mi)

Population (2026-01-01)
  - Total: 4,193
  - Density: 137.3/km^{2} (355.7/sq mi)
- Postal codes: 6567
- NIS code: 56049
- Area codes: 071
- Website: merbeslechateau.be

Merbes-le-Château (French pronunciation: [mɛʁb lə ʃɑto]; Walloon: Miebe) is a municipality of Wallonia located in the province of Hainaut, Belgium.

On January 1, 2006, Merbes-le-Château had a total population of 4,093. The total area is 30.24 km^{2} which gives a population density of 135 inhabitants per km^{2}.

The municipality consists of the following districts: Fontaine-Valmont, Labuissière, Merbes-le-Château, and Merbes-Sainte-Marie.
