= Battle of Courtrai (1793) =

Battle of the War of the First Coalition

- Part of the War of the First Coalition
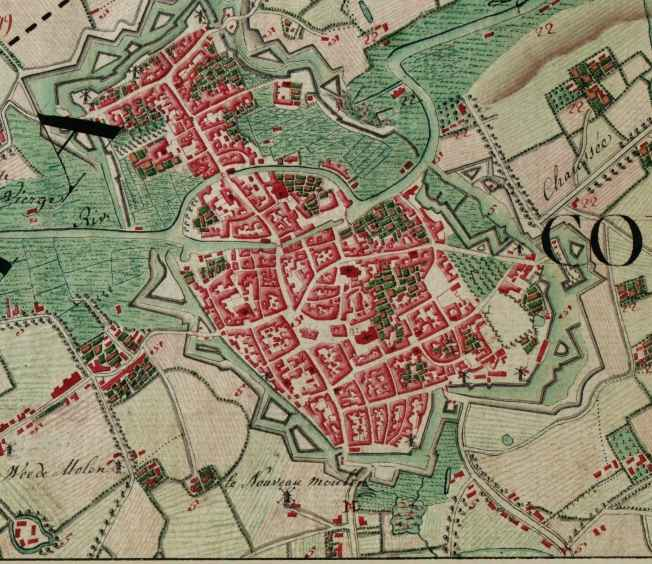
- Map of Kortrijk by Joseph de Ferraris
Date	15 September 1793
Location	Kortrijk, Belgium
Result	Coalition victory

Belligerents
(Habsburg monarchy) Habsburg Austria	(French First Republic) Republican France

Commanders and leaders
(Habsburg monarchy) Johann Beaulieu	(French First Republic) Joseph Hédouville (French First Republic) Pierre Dumesny

Strength
6,000	16,500

Casualties and losses
100	400

The 1st Battle of Courtrai took place on 15 September 1793, near Courtrai, now known as Kortrijk, Belgium. the battle occurred two days after the Battle of Menin during the Flanders Campaign of the Wars of the French Revolution, fought between a Division of the Nicolas Houchard's French Republican Army of the North under Joseph de Hédouville, and an Austrian force under Johann Beaulieu, supported by a British detachment from the forces of the Duke of York. It resulted in an Allied victory that brought an end to Houchard's campaign, and led directly to his dismissal and subsequent execution.

== Background ==
Following his victory at the Battle of Hondschoote and consequent relief of Dunkirk, Houchard turned from his pursuit of the Duke of York, intending to hold off the British to the north with 20,000 men, and march with the rest of his command to the relief of Le Quesnoy, under siege from a large part of the Imperial army under the Prince of Coburg. His first aim was to capture Tournai, but first had to neutralise the threat of Prince William of Orange's Dutch contingent, which had pulled back from Ypres to Menin. The Dutch initially planned to withdraw as far as Courtrai, but when news came through that Le Quesnoy had fallen on 11 September and they would be supported by 15,000 men of Beaulieu’s column the Prince stood at Menin. On 12 September Houchard inflicted a serious defeat on the Prince of Orange at Menin, the Dutch abandoning Courtrai and retreating towards Ghent.

The Republican army had now created a dangerous salient in the Allied line, which threatened to cut communications between York to the north and the main Imperial army, still around Le Quesnoy. Hearing of the Dutch defeat, York manoeuvred to cover them, while Beaulieu withdrew to Lendelede. Houchard however, was unaware that Le Quesnoy had fallen, and continued planning to advance East, ordering the Divisions of Joseph de Hédouville and Pierre Dumesny to advance south towards Lille.

== Battle ==
On the evening of the 14th, Beaulieu with 6 battalions and 6 squadrons occupied Courtrai. On the same day, York’s command reached Thorout, where, in a council of war, he determined to attack Menin.

On 15 September, as York marched against Menin, Hédouville left Menin with part of his division and sent Demars’ brigade of 3,000 men down the Lys river to threaten Courtrai. Demars was less than enthusiastic for this dangerous task, but was threatened with denouncement to Houchard if he disobeyed: "He must take Courtrai or burn it with his shells". York was en route at Rousselare (Roulers) when he heard the news, and immediately detached General Erbach, commanding his advance guard of Hanovarian infantry and British Cavalry, to assist Beaulieu's Austrians, followed by 4 more battalions.

As Demars approached Courtrai, Beaulieu advanced out of the town and drove them back. Hédouville brought up reinforcements from Menin, but these too were driven back, pursued closely by the Austrians.

With the bulk of Hédouville's Division en route to Lille, Demars was left outside Menin to hold the Allies off until night, but the appearance of Erbach's command placed them in full flight. Daendels, commanding in Menin was able to hold out for a while, but panic set in again and Menin was abandoned, many drowning in the river in their desperation to escape. The Anglo-Austrian pursuit was only held off by Antoine Béru with some light guns (for which he was promoted to Général de Division the following day). French casualties were 500 killed and wounded, 200 prisoners and 2 guns.

== Aftermath ==
Despite comparatively light casualties, Beaulieu's victory, combined with the loss of Le Quesnoy and catastrophic defeat of Declaye's relief column at Avesnes-le-Sec on 11 September, turned the tables and brought an end to Houchard's campaign. In a very short time the Republicans were back in the defensive positions they’d started in before Hondschoote. Nevertheless, the rapid withdrawal of the Republican army meant a lost opportunity for the Allies, narrowly preventing the greater potential disaster of being trapped between the forces of York to the north, Beaulieu to the East, and the main body of Coburg's command advancing from Cysoing in the south.

Hédouville and Dumesny were both arrested, but avoided execution. On 24 September Houchard was arrested at Lille on charges of failing to exploit his victory at Hondschoote and for the loss of Le Quesnoy, and was guillotined in Paris on 17 November.
