= Georg von Düring =

German soldier in service of the Landgraviate of Hesse-Darmstadt

Georg Emil von Düring
- Born: 1756
- Died: 1795 (aged 38–39)
- Military career
- Allegiance: Holy Roman Empire
- Rank: General
- Conflicts: Napoleonic Wars

Georg Emil von Düring (1756-1795) was a German soldier in service of the Landgraviate of Hesse-Darmstadt and a member of the von Düring noble family. He was the brother of Johann Christian von Düring der Ältere, a Hanoverian Generalmajor and Oberforstmeister.

In 1790 he was made Colonel and commander of the newly raised Regiment of Hesse-Darmstadt Chevauxlegers (Light Cavalry), garrisoned in Darmstadt and its surroundings. At its head he served in the pay of the Dutch Republic against republican France during the early years of the War of the First Coalition on the lower Rhine, first seeing action at the taking of Frankfurt and Schasshausen on 2 December 1792. In 1793 the regiment served on the Lahn, at Landau and at the siege of Mainz.

He was promoted Major General in 1794, when the Hesse-Darmstadt contingent passed into the pay of Great Britain, serving under the Duke of York in the Flanders Campaign. The Hesse Darmstadt contingent saw action at the Battles of Courtrai and Tourcoing, and numerous actions during the retreat from Belgium.

In September of that year he commanded the Hesse-Darmstadt contingent during the Battle of Boxtel, where the majority of his command was forced to surrender.

According to the Gehrde church register, he died on May 9, 1795 after shooting himself with a pistol in a chariot between Menslage and Badbergen while on route towards Gehrde.
