= Battle of Avesnes-le-Sec =

Battle of the War of the First Coalition

Battle of Avesnes le Sec
- Part of French Revolutionary Wars
- The location of Nord-Pas-de-Calais, where Avesnes-le-Sec is located.
Date	12 September 1793
Location	Avesnes-le-Sec, Nord-Pas-de-Calais, France 50.25°N 3.378°E
Result	Austrian Victory

Belligerents
(Habsburg monarchy) Austria	France

Commanders and leaders
(Habsburg monarchy) Prince of Hohenlohe-Kirchberg (Habsburg monarchy) Johann I of Liechtenstein	(France) Nicolas Declaye

Strength
2,000 cavalry	4,663

Casualties and losses
69 troops	2,000 killed and wounded; 2,000 soldiers and 20 artillery pieces captured

The Battle of Avesnes-le-Sec was a military action during the Flanders Campaign of the French Revolutionary Wars, between French forces under General Nicolas Declaye, and Imperial Austrian forces under Prince of Hohenlohe-Kirchberg. The Austrian cavalrymen made an overwhelming charge against the French and severely defeated them.

== Background ==
In August 1793 the French Army of the North under Jean Nicolas Houchard faced the Imperial army of The Prince of Coburg. Houchard's attention was focused on drawing his forces to his left flank to relieve Dunkirk resulting in the Battle of Hondschoote. Activities on the right (southern) theatre of the war in Flanders centred on the Siege of Le Quesnoy. Coburg had cleared the forest of Mormal in August, forcing the French defenders back to Landrecies and Bouchain, and began the siege of the town with the forces of Clerfaye. Houchard gave orders for a relief attempt from two columns.

== Battle ==
On the evening of 11 September two columns prepared to march against the besieging forces. Jean Alexander Ihler left Maubeuge with 14,000 men, marching through Landrecies and Avesnes where he collected more men, and attacked the covering forces. He was beaten back, his command retreating "in the greatest disorder".

The second column under General Nicolas Declaye initially consisted of the garrison of Cambrai (2,500 infantry, 240 cavalry and 120 gunners), largely untested raw recruits. These left the town at 1.00 a.m. on 12 September to the sound of the bells celebrating news of Houchard's victories. They were joined at Bouchain by some 1,300 men from the garrison, giving Declaye 4,663 men and leaving both towns now largely undefended. The idealistic levees of this column carried with them two guillotines, but, in the words of Ramsay Phipps, "these heroes soon found the difference between beheading defenceless fellow countrymen and meeting in the field the men they loved to describe as 'the slaves of the tyrants'"

Declaye marched the column through Avesnes-le-Sec, then turned left towards the Austrian camp at Solesmes. Hohenlohe commanded 2,000 cavalrymen, which appeared to the left of Villers. Declaye attempted to fall back towards Avesnes-le-Sec, but the Austrian squadrons charged and quickly dispersed the Republican cavalry, which abandoned the field for Bouchain, followed closely by Declaye himself. His infantry formed square just outside Avesnes to receive the enemy cavalry, but these untrained men were completely ridden over by Lichtenstein and mercilessly sabred, the Austrians (including the French émigré Royal-Allemand regiment) inflicting losses of 2,000 killed and wounded while losing only 69 men. In addition, 2,000 soldiers and 18 artillery pieces were captured.

== Aftermath ==
Had Coburg followed up this victory he would have found Cambrai and Bouchain stripped of men to fill out Declaye's column and completely open, however the Austrians turned their attentions towards besieging Maubeuge. Declaye was arrested for his conduct, however managed to avoid punishment due to his strong republicanism and political connections.
