= Low Countries theatre of the War of the First Coalition =

1792–95 campaign of the War of the First Coalition

Low Countries theatre of the War of the First Coalition Flanders campaign
- Part of the War of the First Coalition
- The French conquest of the Low Countries from May 1794 until June 1795
Date	20 April 1792 – 7 June 1795
Location	Belgium, Northern France, Netherlands, and the Rhineland
Result	French victory
Territorial changes	Austrian Netherlands and Liège annexed by France; Batavian Republic created as a French satellite

Belligerents
Kingdom of the French (to Sept 1792) (France) French Republic (from 1792): (Dutch Republic) Patriots	Dutch Republic; Great Britain; Holy Roman Empire: Austria; (Province of Hanover) Hanover; Hesse-Kassel; Hesse-Darmstadt; Kingdom of Prussia; Armée des Émigrés

Commanders and leaders
(France) Adam Philippe, Comte de Custine (executed); (France) Auguste Marie Henri Picot de Dampierre †; (France) Charles François Dumouriez; (France) Jean Nicolas Houchard (executed); (France) Charles Kilmaine; (France) Charles Pichegru; (France) Joseph Souham; (France) Jean Moreau; (France) Jean-Baptiste Jourdan; (France) (Dutch Republic) Herman Willem Daendels	(Habsburg monarchy) Prince of Saxe-Coburg; (Habsburg monarchy) François Sébastien de Croix de Clerfayt; (Habsburg monarchy) Johann Peter Beaulieu; (Habsburg monarchy) Franz von Kaunitz-Rietberg; (Habsburg monarchy) Mack von Lieberich; (Dutch Republic) William, Hereditary Prince of Orange; (Dutch Republic) Prince Frederick; (Kingdom of Great Britain) Duke of York; (Kingdom of Great Britain) William Harcourt; (Kingdom of Great Britain) William Erskine; (Kingdom of Prussia) Alexander von Knobelsdorff; (Hesse) Ludwig von Wurmb; (Province of Hanover) Heinrich von Freytag; (Province of Hanover) Johann von Wallmoden-Gimborn

Strength
	1793: 174,325 (Kingdom of Prussia) 64,523 (Dutch Republic) 60,000 (Kingdom of Great Britain) (Province of Hanover) 17,440; 6,000

The Low Countries theatre of the War of the First Coalition, also known as the Flanders campaign, was a series of campaigns in the Low Countries conducted from 20 April 1792 to 7 June 1795 during the first years of the War of the First Coalition. As the French Revolution radicalised, the revolutionary National Convention and its predecessors broke the Catholic Church's power (1790), abolished the monarchy (1792) and even executed the deposed king Louis XVI (1793), vying to spread the Revolution beyond the new French Republic's borders, by violent means if necessary. The First Coalition, an alliance of reactionary states representing the Ancien Régime in Central and Western Europe – Habsburg Austria (including the Southern Netherlands), Prussia, Great Britain, the Dutch Republic (the Northern Netherlands), Hanover and Hesse-Kassel – mobilised military forces along all the French frontiers, threatening to invade Revolutionary France and violently restore the monarchy. The subsequent combat operations along the French borders with the Low Countries and Germany became the primary theatre of the War of the First Coalition until March 1796, when Napoleon took over French command on the Italian front. (Note: 'The campaigns in Italy between France and members of the First Coalition from 1792 to 1797 were initially regarded as occurring in a secondary theater of operations to the campaigns fought along France's borders with the Low Countries and Germany. However, in March 1796 a young general, Napoleon Bonaparte, was place in command of a dispirited French army along the Riviera and began a one-year campaign that forced Piedmont-Sardinia out of the war and obliged Austria to accept peace, ending the War of the First Coalition in France's favor.')

The April–June 1792 French incursions into the Austrian Netherlands were a disaster, eventually leading frustrated radical revolutionaries to depose the king in August. An unexpected French success in the Battle of Jemappes in November 1792 was followed by a major Coalition victory at Neerwinden in March 1793. After this initial stage, the largest of these forces assembled on the Franco-Flemish border. In this theatre a combined army of Anglo-Hanoverian, Dutch, Hessian, Imperial Austrian and (south of the river Sambre) Prussian troops faced the republican Armée du Nord, and (further to the south) two smaller forces, the Armée des Ardennes and the Armée de la Moselle. The Allies enjoyed several early victories, but were unable to advance beyond the French border fortresses. Coalition forces were eventually forced to withdraw by a series of French counter-offensives, and the May 1794 Austrian decision to redeploy any troops in Poland.

The Allies established a new front in the south of the Netherlands and Germany, but with failing supplies and the Prussians pulling out, they were forced to continue their retreat through the arduous winter of 1794/5. The Austrians pulled back to the lower Rhine and the British to Hanover from where they were eventually evacuated. The victorious French were aided in their conquest by Patriots from the Northern and Southern Netherlands, who had previously been forced to flee to France after their own revolutions in the north in 1787 and in the south in 1789/91 had failed. These Patriots now returned under French banners as "Batavians" and "Belgians" to 'liberate' their countries. The republican armies pushed on to Amsterdam and early in 1795 replaced the Dutch Republic with a client state, the Batavian Republic, whilst the Austrian Netherlands and the Prince-Bishopric of Liège were annexed by the French Republic.

Prussia and Hesse-Kassel would recognise the French victory and territorial gains with the Peace of Basel (1795). Austria would not acknowledge the loss of the Southern Netherlands until the 1797 Treaty of Leoben and later the Treaty of Campo Formio. The Dutch stadtholder William V, Prince of Orange, who had fled to England, also initially refused to recognise the Batavian Republic, and in the Kew Letters ordered all Dutch colonies to temporarily accept British authority instead. Not until the 1801 Oranienstein Letters would he recognise the Batavian Republic, and his son William Frederick accept the Principality of Nassau-Orange-Fulda as compensation for the loss of the hereditary stadtholderate.

== Background ==
=== France, Britain and the Dutch Republic ===
By the end of the American Revolutionary War in the early 1780s, France was providing significant financial support to the American rebels to help the Thirteen Colonies break away from the British Empire. Although London had to recognise the United States' independence in 1783, this French foreign policy success came at a terrible financial cost, as the Bourbon kingdom struggled with enormous debts. The Eden Agreement of 1786 ended the Anglo-French economic war and allowed both countries to somewhat recover, but the terms were very unfavourable to the French, stoking resentment.

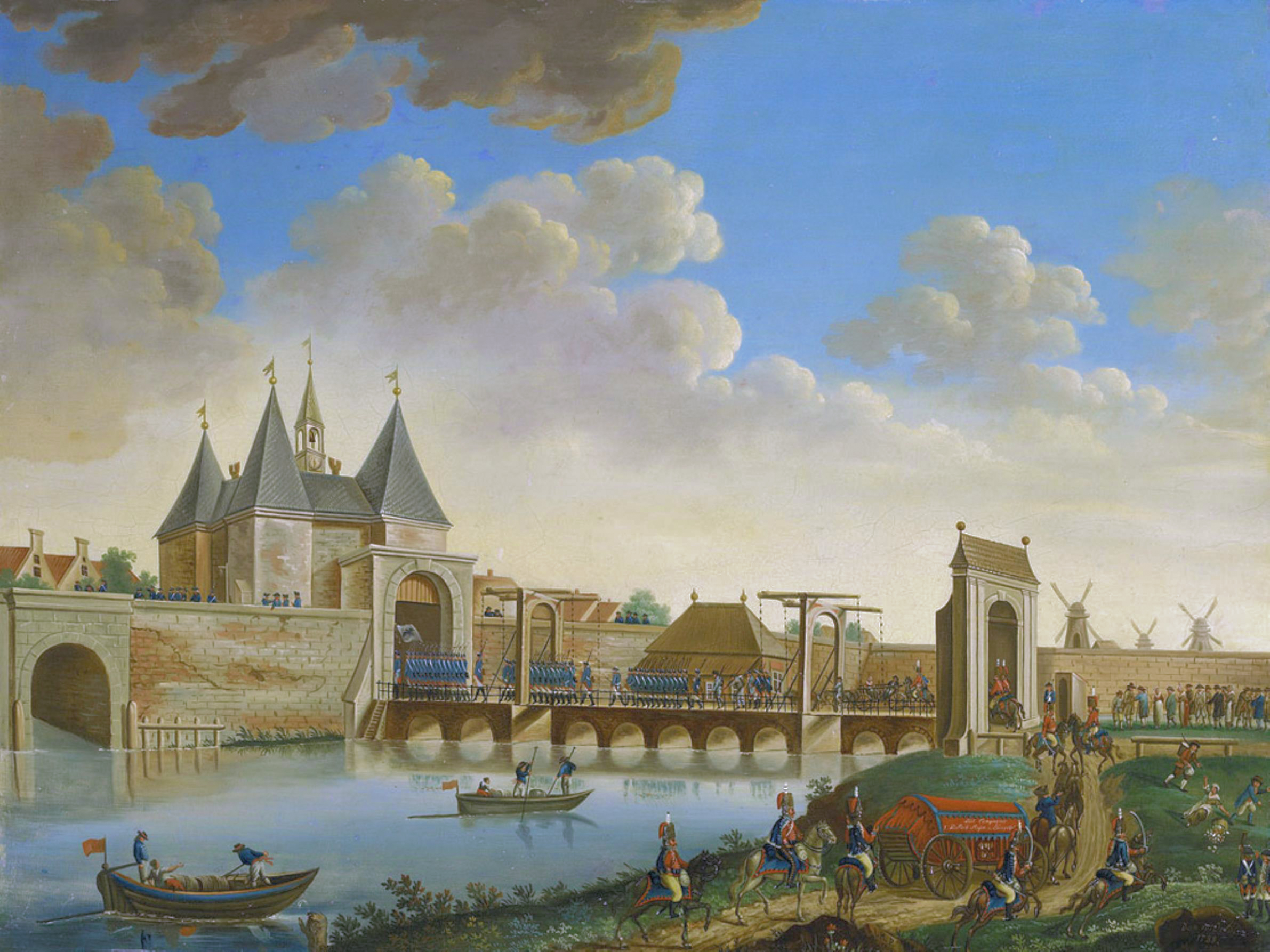
Prussian troops enter Amsterdam, 1787

The Dutch Republic had been divided on the American Revolution; whilst the stadtholderian regime of William V, Prince of Orange sought to back his cousin George III of Britain against the American rebels, a large group of democratic-republican Dutch Patriot regenten supported the rebels and sought to trade with them. Rising tensions led to Britain declaring the Fourth Anglo-Dutch War (1780–1784), which thoroughly decimated the Dutch navy. The land defences of the Northern Netherlands were also in poor condition, its States Army not having fought in a war for 45 years. Growing Patriot dissatisfaction with the Orangist government during the war prompted the so-called Batavian Revolution, spurred on by the 1781 pamphlet Aan het Volk van Nederland (spread anonymously by Joan Derk van der Capellen), which called on all citizens to arm themselves, overthrow the stadtholder and form an alliance with the United States and France against Britain. Tensions between the two factions escalated to a brief, low-level civil war in 1786–1787.

William V only managed to suppress the Patriot revolt with great difficulty after the Prussian and British intervention in 1787, exiling many Patriots to France. William's Anglo-Prussian allies enabled him to preserve the House of Orange, and strengthen his authoritarian stadtholderate regime by the Act of Guarantee (April 1788). Under the August 1788 Triple Alliance, the United Provinces became a de facto Anglo-Prussian protectorate. When the French Revolution broke out in May–June 1789, Britain and the Dutch Republic initially adopted a neutral policy towards the revolution in France, which temporarily withdrew from the international stage to deal with internal problems. Even when Southern Netherlandish revolutionaries offered William to unite the Low Countries under his house in May 1789 and early 1790, the Northern stadtholder rejected the advances and refused to get involved.

=== Southern Netherlands, Austria and Prussia ===
While the French Revolution unfolded, simultaneous political crises were brewing in the Austrian Netherlands, as emperor Joseph II had been seeking to force through various political reforms since 1787, in the face of opposition from the conservative nobility and clergy. Revolutionary Henri Van der Noot had vainly lobbied at the Orangist and British courts in May 1789 for a military intervention in the Southern Netherlands to drive out the Habsburg Austrians. Only Prussia showed limited interest in his request; it rejected revolutionary ideas, but found any chance to weaken its Habsburg rival attractive. Matters came to a head when Joseph II launched a coup d'état on 18 June 1789, unilaterally abolishing the States-General and revoking all noble privileges. Archbishop Joannes-Henricus de Franckenberg eventually called for armed resistance to defend the Catholic Church, and the secret society Pro aris et focis of Jan Frans Vonck and Jan-Baptist Verlooy began recruiting troops for a rebel army. Some exiled Northern Patriots living in Brussels joined. With the French Revolution to the south escalating, and the Liège Revolution erupting in the neighbouring Prince-Bishopric of Liège in August 1789, the Brabant Revolution finally broke out in the Austrian Netherlands in October 1789. The Brabantine rebel army defeated the Austrian forces at the Battle of Turnhout in October, and by January 1790, revolutionary Patriots led by Van der Noot and Vonck had taken control of most of the Southern Netherlands, and proclaimed the United Belgian States, alongside the Liège Republic. Both rebel states were unofficially protected by a Prussian army occupying Liège to thwart possible Austrian attempts at restoration.

However, aside from the small Prussian force, no foreign power supported the young Belgian polity. And although many revolutionaries in Brussels wore orange cockades in January and February 1790, in hopes of uniting the Northern and Southern Netherlands under the House of Orange, William V once again showed no interest. Moreover, divisions within the Brabantine rebellion soon led to conflict between the conservative Statists led by Van der Noot and the liberal Vonckists, who were expelled. Finally, after Joseph II died and was succeeded by his brother Leopold II, he reconciled himself with Frederick William II of Prussia with the Treaty of Reichenbach (27 July 1790), as they both feared French aggression and decided to cooperate. Due to Anglo-Austrian diplomatic pressure, Prussian troops were withdrawn from Liège to allow an Austrian restoration. Vienna's truce with the Ottomans in September freed up 30,000 troops for an expedition to the Southern Netherlands, ending both the United Belgian States and the Liège Republic by January 1791. Most Statists would reconcile themselves with Leopold II's conservative government. Revolutionary fervour had not perished, however, and when French Republican forces invaded the South in November 1792, Liégeois and Vonckist Patriots would aid in their conquest. About 2,500 Liégeois and Southern Netherlandish emigrants fought on the French side in the Battle of Jemappes.

Ernst Kossmann (1986) analysed: 'In the end, the whole conflict in North and South had the same conclusion: the Prussian army met just as little resistance in the [Dutch] Republic as the Austrian did in Belgium. And just like the restored Orangist regime turned the Patriots into Francophile extremists, the Vonckists exiled to France forgot the nationalism out of which their movement had emerged, and eventually they would gleefully welcome the foreign revolution into their country. The major fact of subsequent years is the denationalisation of the democratic reform faction that had originated from nationalism.'

== Outbreak of war ==
Meanwhile, the failed June 1791 Flight to Varennes of king Louis XVI and his Austrian-born queen Marie Antoinette (Leopold II's sister) sparked more anti-royalist and republican sentiment, radicalising the French Revolution further. With their differences settled and the Brabant and Liège Revolutions in the Southern Netherlands crushed, Austria and Prussia turned their attention to France, issuing the Declaration of Pillnitz (27 August 1791) that it was "in the common interest of all sovereigns of Europe" that no harm may come to the French royal family, and that if necessary, they would militarily intervene in order to protect the monarchy. The Girondins, the dominant faction in the Legislative Assembly, sought to export the revolution abroad and also break the power of other European monarchs, while Louis XVI hoped that his full royal powers would be restored if France lost a war with Austria and Prussia, which had concluded a defensive alliance on 7 February 1792. Thus, supported by the Girondin Assembly, king Louis XVI of France declared war on Austria on 20 April 1792; Prussia immediately joined its Austrian ally against France. Britain and the Northern Netherlands sought to maintain their neutrality, but the British government was increasingly concerned about the security of the United Provinces.

Overall Allied command was led by the Austrian commander Prince Josias of Saxe-Coburg-Saalfeld, with a staff of Austrian advisers answering to Emperor Francis II and the Austrian Foreign Minister Johann, Baron Thugut. When Britain entered the war in February 1793, the Duke of York was obliged to follow objectives set by Pitt's Foreign Minister Henry Dundas. Thus Allied military decisions in the campaign were tempered by political objectives from Vienna and London.

Opposing the Allies, the armies of the French Republic were in a state of disruption; old soldiers of the Ancien Régime fought side by side with raw volunteers, urged on by revolutionary fervour from the représentant en mission. Many of the old officer class had emigrated, leaving the cavalry in particular in chaotic condition. Only the artillery arm, less affected by emigration, had survived intact. The problems would become even more acute following the introduction of mass conscription, the Levée en Masse, in 1793. French commanders balanced between maintaining the security of the frontier, and clamours for victory (which would protect the regime in Paris) on the one hand, and the desperate condition of the army on the other, while they themselves were constantly under suspicion from the representatives. The price of failure or disloyalty was the guillotine.

== 1792 campaign ==
=== Initial French disasters ===
The first skirmishes on the northern front took place during the battles of Quiévrain and Marquain (28–30 April 1792), in which ill-prepared French revolutionary armies were easily expelled from the Austrian Netherlands. The revolutionaries were forced on the defensive for months, losing Verdun and barely saving Thionville until the Coalition's unexpected defeat at Valmy (20 September 1792) turned the tables, and opened up a new opportunity for a northward invasion. The fresh momentum emboldened the revolutionaries to definitively abolish the monarchy and proclaim the French First Republic the very next day.

=== Battle of Jemappes and Austrian retreat ===
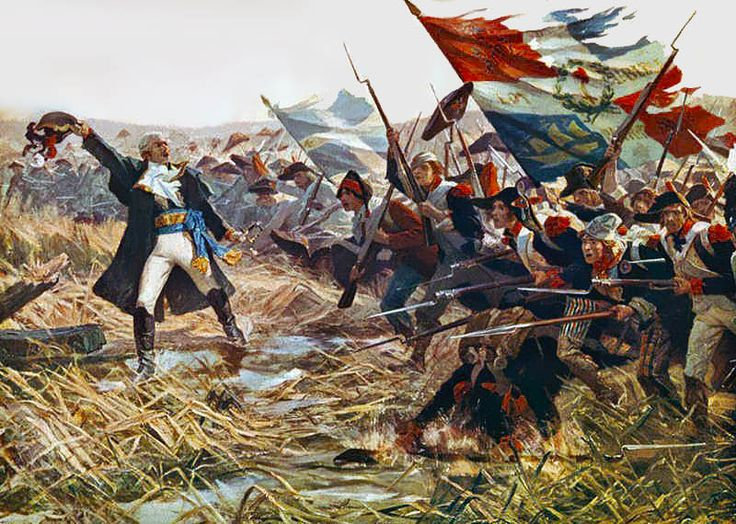
19th-century painting romanticising the Battle of Jemappes

On 6 November 1792, French commander Charles François Dumouriez managed to achieve a surprise victory over the Imperial command under the Duke of Saxe-Teschen and Clerfayt at the Battle of Jemappes. By the end of 1792, Dumouriez had marched largely unopposed across most of the Austrian Netherlands and the Prince-Bishopric of Liège, an area that roughly corresponds to present-day Belgium. As the Austrians retreated, Dumouriez saw an opportunity with the Patriot exiles to overthrow the weak Dutch Republic by making a bold move north. A second French Division under Francisco de Miranda manoeuvred against the Austrians and Hanoverians in eastern Belgium.

The French government issued a declaration on 16 November to end the closure of the Scheldt and reopen the river for navigation after 200 years, as well as asserting the right of the French armies to pursue Austrian troops into neutral territory. Another decree on 19 November stated that the French Republic would support revolutionaries abroad. The British government regarded these statements and initial incursions into Dutch territory as violating the Netherlands' sovereignty and neutrality, and began preparing for war. Meanwhile, William V had joined the anti-French coalition, leading French forces to justify an invasion of Staats-Brabant. In December 1792, Miranda conquered Roermond.

== 1793 campaign ==
=== Dumouriez's invasion of the Dutch Republic ===
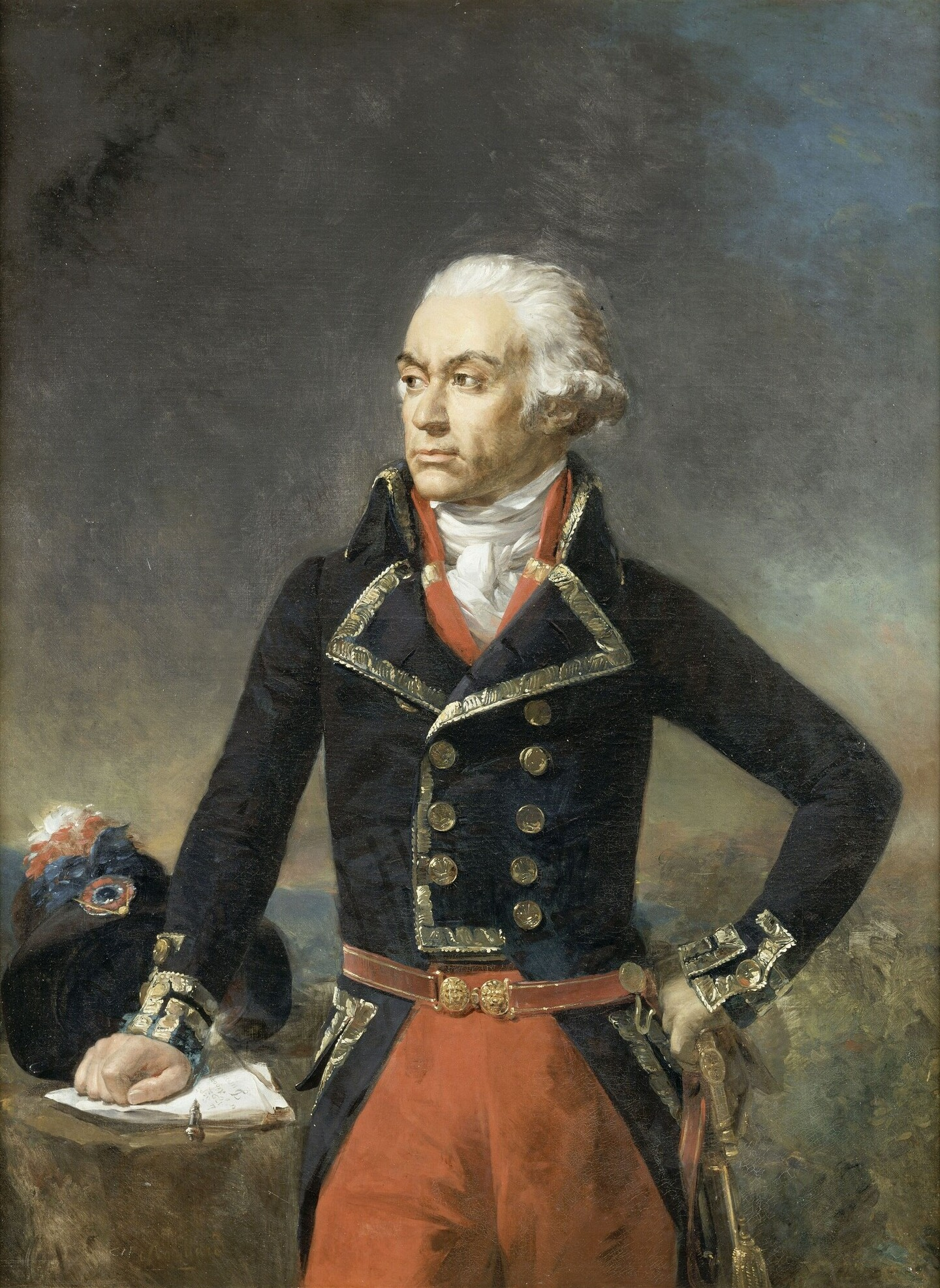
General Dumouriez. 1834 painting by Jean-Sébastien Rouillard

The execution of the deposed French king Louis XVI on 21 January 1793 stoked more fears amongst the other European monarchs that they would be next. France formally declared war on Britain and the Netherlands on 1 February 1793, and soon afterwards against Spain as well. Throughout 1793, the Holy Roman Empire, Sardinia, Portugal, Naples, and Tuscany declared war on France. Allied armies mobilised along all of the French frontiers, the largest and most important in the Flanders Franco-Belgian border region. British Prime Minister Pitt the Younger pledged to finance the formation of the First Coalition.

In the Low Countries, the Allies' immediate aim was to eject the French from the Dutch Republic (modern The Netherlands) and the Austrian Netherlands (modern Belgium), then march on Paris to end the chaotic and bloody French version of republican government. Austria and Prussia broadly supported this aim, but both were short of money. Britain agreed to invest a million pounds to finance a large Austrian army in the field plus a smaller Hanoverian corps, and dispatched an expeditionary force that eventually grew to approximately 20,000 British troops under the command of the king's younger son, the Duke of York. Initially, just 1,500 troops landed with York in February 1793.

On 16 February 1793, Dumouriez's republican Armée du Nord advanced from Antwerp and invaded Dutch Brabant. Dutch forces fell back to the line of the Meuse abandoning the fortress of Breda after a short siege, and the Stadtholder called on Britain for help. Within nine days an initial British guards brigade had been assembled and dispatched across the English Channel, landing at Hellevoetsluis under the command of general Lake and the Duke of York. Meanwhile, while Dumouriez moved north into Brabant, a separate army under Francisco de Miranda laid siege to Maastricht on 23 February. However the Austrians had been reinforced to 39,000 and, now commanded by Saxe-Coburg, crossed the Roer River on 1 March and drove back the Republican French near Aldenhoven. The next day the Austrians took Aachen before reaching Maastricht on the Meuse and forcing Miranda to lift the siege.

In the northern part of this theatre, Coburg thwarted Dumouriez's ambitions with a series of victories that evicted the French from the Austrian Netherlands altogether. This successful offensive reached its climax when Dumouriez was defeated at the Battle of Neerwinden on 18 March, and again at Louvain on 21 March. Dumouriez defected to the Allies on 6 April and was replaced as head of the Armée du Nord by general Picot de Dampierre. France faced attacks on several fronts, and few expected the war to last very long. However, instead of capitalising on this advantage, the Allied advance became pedestrian. The large Coalition army on the Rhine under the Duke of Brunswick was reluctant to advance due to hopes for a political settlement. The Coalition Army in Flanders had the opportunity to brush past Dampierre's demoralised army, but the Austrian staff was not fully aware of the degree of the French weakness and, while awaiting the arrival of reinforcements from Britain, Hanover and Prussia, turned instead to besiege fortresses along the French borders. The first objective was Condé-sur-l'Escaut, at the confluence of the Haine and Scheldt rivers.

=== Coalition spring offensive ===
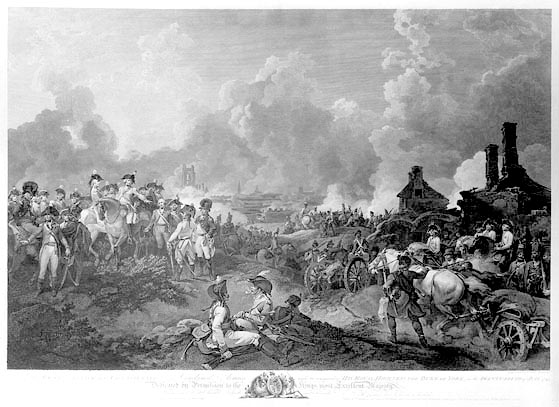
York's attack on Valenciennes

At the beginning of April the Allied powers met in conference at Antwerp to agree their strategy against France. Coburg was a reluctant leader and had hoped to end the war through diplomacy with Dumouriez, he even issued a proclamation declaring he was the "ally of all friends of order, abjuring all projects of conquest in the Emperors name", which he was immediately forced to recant by his political masters. The British desired Dunkirk as an indemnity against the war, and proposed that they would support Coburg's military campaign provided the Austrians supported their politically inspired designs on Dunkirk. Coburg eventually proposed they attack Condé and Valenciennes in turn, then move against Dunkirk.

On the Rhine front the Prussians besieged Mainz, which held out from 14 April to 23 July 1793, and simultaneously mounted an offensive that swept through the Rhineland, mopping up small and disorganized elements of the French army. Meanwhile, in Flanders, Coburg began investing the French fortifications at Condé-sur-l'Escaut, now reinforced by the Anglo-Hanoverian corps of the Duke of York and Prussian contingent of Alexander von Knobelsdorff. Facing the allies, though his men desperately needed rest and reorganisation, Dampierre was hampered and controlled by the representatives on mission. On 19 April he attacked the Allies across a wide front at St. Amand but was beaten off. On 8 May the French attempted once more to relieve Condé, but, after a fierce combat at Raismes, in which Dampierre was mortally wounded, the attempt failed.

The arrival of York and Knobelsdorff raised Coburg's command to upwards of 90,000 men, which allowed Coburg to next move against Valenciennes. On 23 May York's Anglo-Hanoverian forces saw their debut action at the Battle of Famars. In the same region of the Pas-de-Calais, the French, now under François Joseph Drouot de Lamarche, were driven back in a combined operation which prepared the way for the siege of Valenciennes. Command of the Armée du Nord was given to Adam Custine, who had enjoyed success on the Rhine in 1792; however Custine needed time to re-organise the demoralised army and fell back to the stronghold of Caesar's Camp near Bohain. Stalemate ensued as Custine felt unable to take the offensive and the allies focused on the sieges of Condé and Valenciennes. In July these both fell, Condé on 10 July, Valenciennes on 28 July. Custine was promptly recalled to Paris to answer for his tardiness, and guillotined.

=== Autumn campaign ===
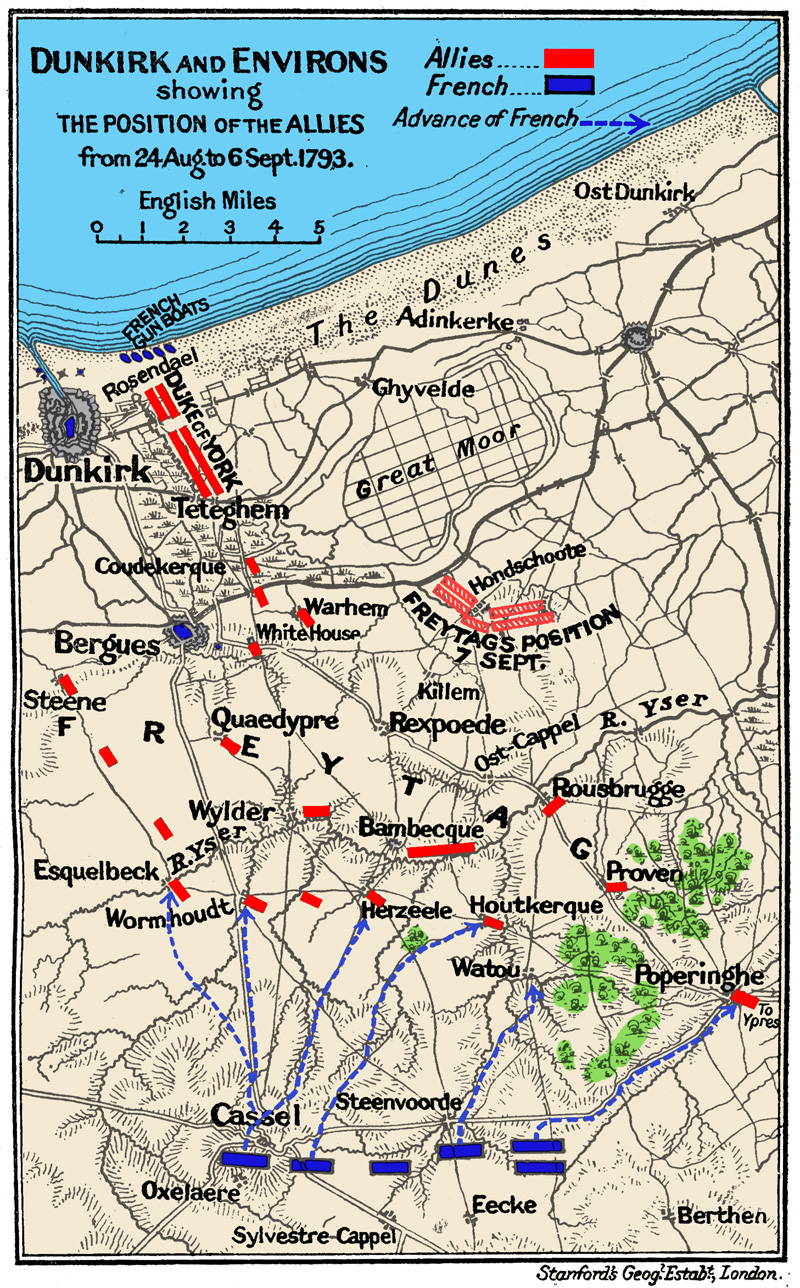
Battle of Hondschoote (6–8 September 1793)

On 7/8 August the French, now under Charles Kilmaine were driven from Caesar's Camp north of Cambrai. The following week in the Tourcoing sector Dutch troops under the Hereditary Prince of Orange attempted to repeat the success but were roughly handled by Jourdan at Lincelles until extricated by the British Guards brigade.

France was now at the mercy of the Coalition. The fall of Condé and Valenciennes had opened a gap in the frontier defences. The republican field armies were in disorder. However, instead of concentrating, the Allies now dispersed their forces. In the south Knobelsdorf's Prussian contingent departed to join the main Prussian army on the Rhine front, while in the north York was under orders from Secretary of State Dundas to lay siege to the French port of Dunkirk, which the British government planned to use as a military base and bargaining counter in any future peace negotiation. This led to conflict with Coburg, who needed the occupying forces to protect his flank by accompanying his thrust towards Cambrai. Lacking York's support the Austrians chose instead to besiege Le Quesnoy, which was invested by Clerfayt on 19 August.

York's forces began the investment of Dunkirk, though they were ill-prepared for a protracted siege and had still not received any heavy siege artillery. The Armée du Nord, now under command of Jean Nicolas Houchard defeated York's exposed left flank under the Hanoverian general Freytag at the Battle of Hondschoote, forcing York to raise the siege and abandon his equipment. The Anglo-Hanoverians fell back in good order to Veurne (Furnes), where they were able to recover as there was no French pursuit. Houchard's plan had actually been to merely repulse the Duke of York so he could march south to relieve Le Quesnoy; on 13 September he defeated the Hereditary Prince at Menin (Menen), capturing 40 guns and driving the Dutch towards Bruges and Ghent, but three days later his forces were routed in turn by Beaulieu at Courtrai.

Further south Coburg meanwhile had captured Le Quesnoy on 11 September, enabling him to move forces north to assist York, and winning a signal victory over one of Houchard's Divisions at Avesnes-le-Sec. As if these disasters were not enough for the French, news reached Paris that in Alsace the Duke of Brunswick had defeated the French at Pirmasens. The Jacobins were stirred into a ferocity of panic. Laws were imposed that placed all lives and property at the disposal of the regime. For failing to follow up his victory at Hondschoote and the defeat at Menen, Houchard was accused of treason, arrested, and guillotined in Paris on 17 November.

At the end of September Coburg began investing Maubeuge, though the allied forces were now stretched. The Duke of York was unable to offer much support as his command was greatly weakened, not only by the strain of the campaign, but also by Dundas in London, who began withdrawing troops to reassign to the West Indies. As a result, Houchard's replacement Jean-Baptiste Jourdan was able to concentrate his forces and narrowly defeat Coburg at the Battle of Wattignies, forcing the Austrians to lift the siege of Maubeuge. The Convention then ordered a general offensive towards York's base at Ostend. In mid October Vandamme laid siege to Nieuport, MacDonald took Wervicq and Dumonceau drove the Hanoverians from Menen, however the French were forced back in sharp rebuffs at Cysoing on 24 October and Marchiennes on 29 October, which effectively brought an end to the year's campaigning.

== 1794 campaign ==
Over the winter both sides re-organised. Reinforcements were transported from Britain in order to shore up the Coalition line. In the Austrian army Coburg's Chief of Staff Prince Hohenlohe was replaced by Karl Mack von Leiberich. At the beginning of 1794 the allied field army numbered somewhat over 100,000 troops, the bulk of the army in positions between Tournai and Bettignies, with both flanks further extended with small outposts and cordons to the Meuse on the left and the Channel coast on the right. Facing them the Armée du Nord was now under the command of Jean-Charles Pichegru, and had been greatly reinforced by conscripts as the result of the Levée en masse, giving the combined strength of the Armies of the North and Ardennes (excluding garrisons) as 200,000, nearly two to one of Coburg's force.

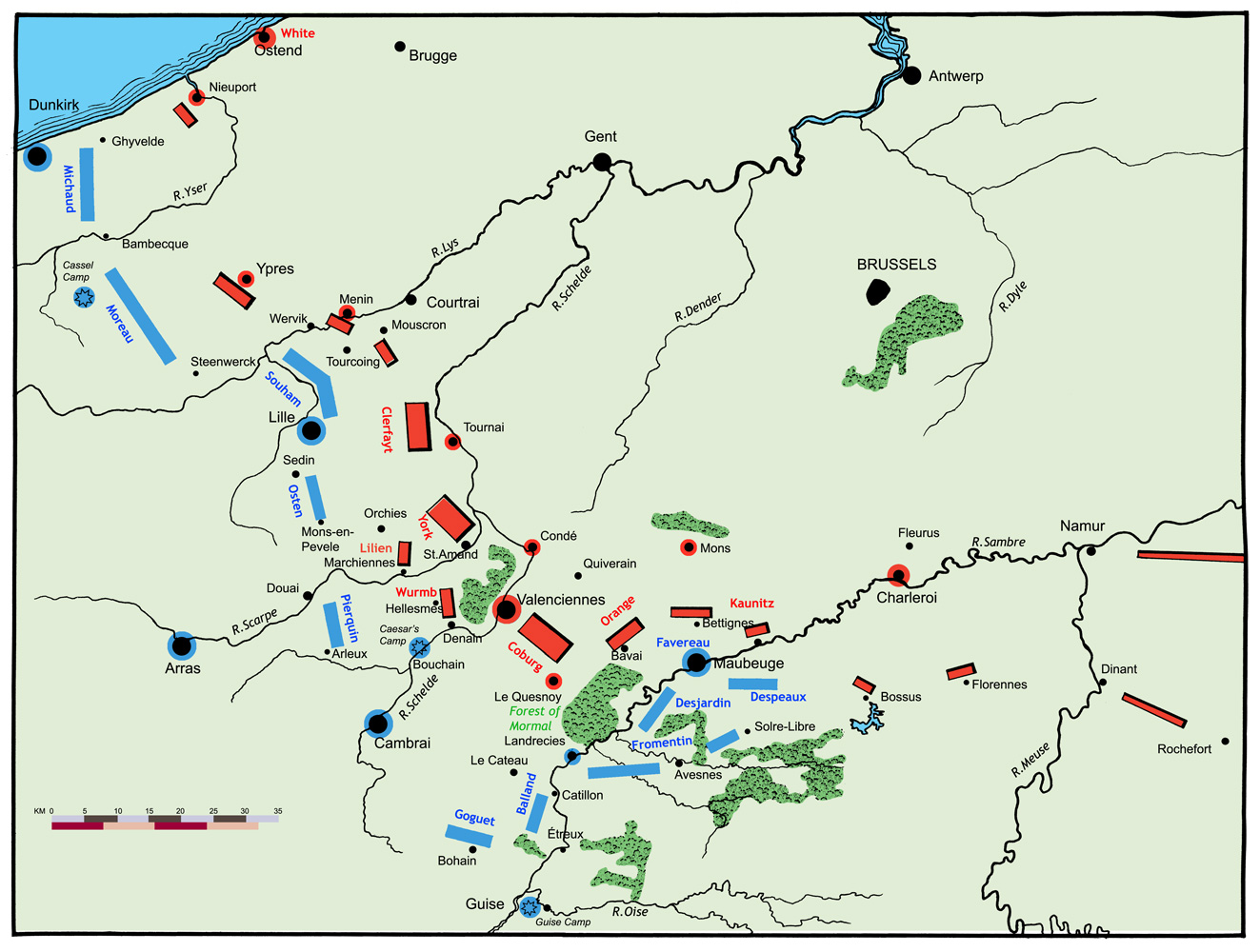
Positions of the armies in early April 1794, at the start of the 1794 campaign First Coalition forces French Republic forces

=== Siege of Landrecies ===
At the beginning of April 1794, Austrian troops were greatly encouraged when the Emperor Francis II joined Coburg at Allied headquarters. The first action of the campaign was a French advance from Le Cateau on 25 March, which was beaten off by Clerfayt after a sharp fight. Two weeks later the Allies began their advance with a series of covered marches and small actions to facilitate the investment of the fortress of Landrecies. York advanced from Saint-Amand towards Le Cateau, Coburg led the centre column from Valenciennes and Le Quesnoy, and to his left the Hereditary Prince led the besieging corps from Bavay through the Forest of Mormal towards Landrecies. On 17 April York drove Goguet from Vaux and Prémont, while the Austrian forces advanced in the direction of Wassigny against Balland. The Hereditary Prince then began the Siege of Landrecies, while the Allied army covered the operation in a semi-circle. On the Left at the eastern end of the line lay the commands of Alvinczi and Kinsky, stretching from Maroilles four miles east of Landrecies, south to Prisches, then south-west to the line of the Sambre river. On the western bank of the river the line ran west from Catillon towards Le Cateau and Cambrai. The right of the Allied line was under the Duke of York and ended near Le Cateau. A line of outposts then ran north-west along the line of the Selle river.

The French plan was to attack both flanks of the allies, while sending relief columns towards Landrecies. On 24 April a small force of British and Austrian cavalry drove back just such a force under Chapuis at Villers-en-Cauchies. Two days later Pichegru launched a three-pronged attempt to relieve Landrecies. Two of the columns in the east were repulsed by the forces of Kinsky, Alvinczi and the young Archduke Charles, while Chapuis's third column advancing from Cambrai was all but destroyed by York at Beaumont/Coteau/Troisvilles on 26 April.

=== French May counter-offensive ===
Landrecies fell on 30 April 1794 and Coburg turned his attention to Maubeuge, the last remaining obstacle to an advance on the French interior. But on the same day Pichegru began his overdue northern counter-offensive, defeating Clerfayt at the Battle of Mouscron and retaking Courtrai (Kortrijk) and Menen.

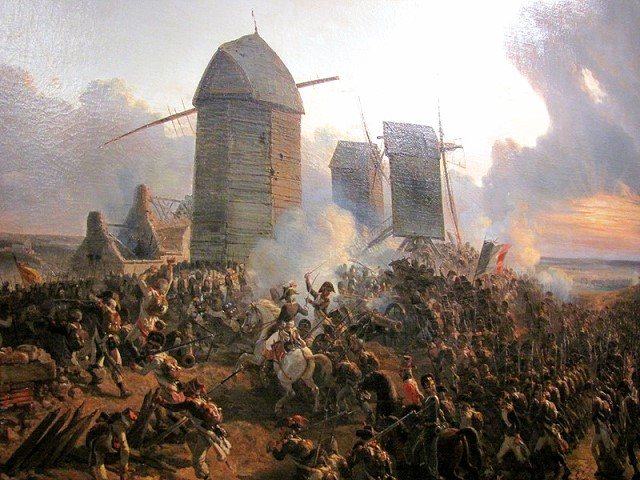
Battle of Mouscron (29 April 1794), painted by Charles Louis Mozin (1839)

For 10 days a lull descended as both sides consolidated before Coburg launched attacks to regain the northern positions on 10 May. Jacques Philippe Bonnaud's French column was defeated by York at the Battle of Willems, but Clerfayt failed to recapture Courtrai and was again driven back in the Battle of Courtrai.

The Coalition forces planned to stem Pichegru's advance with a broad attack involving several isolated columns in a scheme devised by Mack. At the Battle of Tourcoing on 17–18 May this effort became a logistical disaster as communications broke down and columns were delayed. Only a third of the allied force came into action, and were only extricated after the loss of 3,000 men. Pichegru being absent on the Sambre, French command at Tourcoing had devolved onto the shoulders of Joseph Souham. On his return to the front Pichegru renewed the offensive to press his advantage but despite repeated attacks was held off at the Battle of Tournay on 22 May.

Meanwhile, the eastern prong of Pichegru's offensive was taking place on the Sambre river, where divisions of the right wing of Pichegru's Army of the North under Jacques Desjardin and the Army of the Ardennes under Louis Charbonnier attacked across the river to try and establish a foothold on the northern bank. Their objective was the capture of Mons, which would cut the lines of supply and communication from the main Allied base at Brussels to Coburg's centre around Landrecies and Le Quesnoy.

The first French crossing was turned back at the battle of Grand-Reng on 13 May, where a fatally divided high command led to the failure of Desjardin's frontal attack on Allied commander Prince Kaunitz while Charbonnier stood by and ignored the battle, leaving Desjardin vulnerable to an Allied counterattack. A second attempt at consolidating a foothold on the north bank was defeated at the battle of Erquelinnes on 24 May as the Allies surprised the French by attacking out of early morning fog.

French commanders
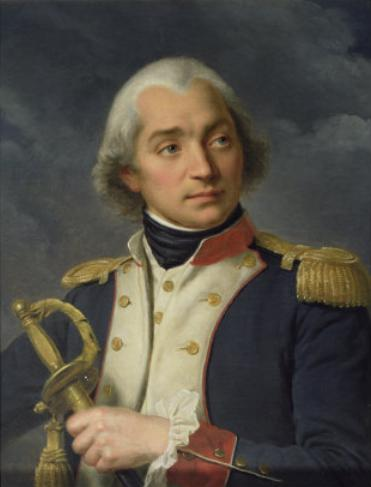
Jean-Charles Pichegru

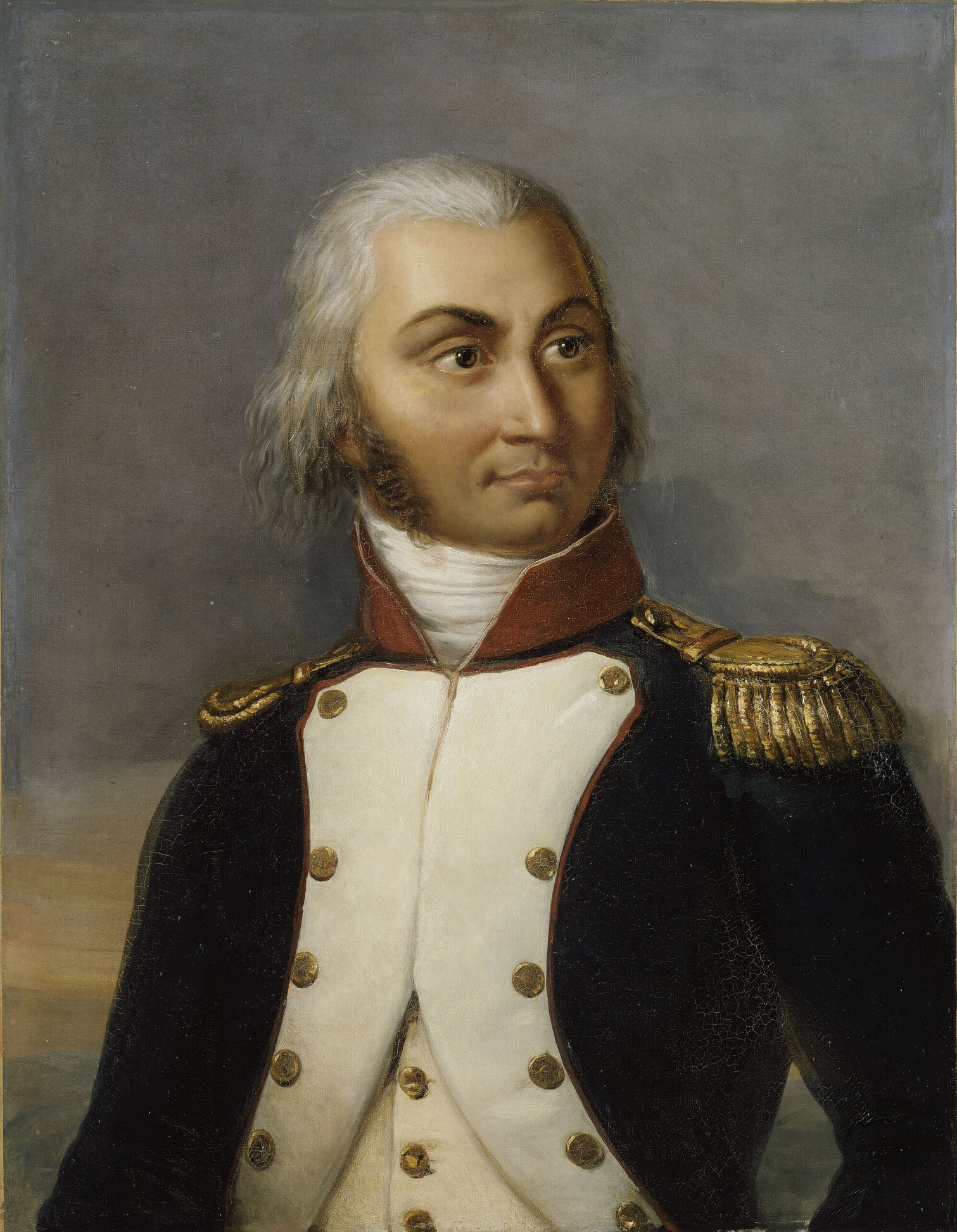
Jean-Baptiste Jourdan

Although the allied front remained intact, subsequently the Austrian commitment to the war became increasingly weakened. The Prussians were already on the point of pulling out of the war due to perceived Austrian duplicity in Bavaria. The Emperor was strongly influenced by Foreign Minister Baron Johann von Thugut, and for Thugut political considerations always overrode military plans. In May 1794 his fixation was with profiting from the Third Partition of Poland, and troops and generals began to be stripped from Coburg's command. Mack resigned as Chief-of-Staff in disgust on 23 May and was replaced by Prince Christian August von Waldeck-Pyrmont, a supporter of Thugut. In a Council of War on 24 May Emperor Francis II called for a vote on withdrawal, then left for Vienna. Only the Duke of York dissented with the withdrawal.

The decision to retreat was taken despite victories on southern flank such as Grand-Reng, Erquelinnes, and Wichard Joachim Heinrich von Möllendorf's victory at the Battle of Kaiserslautern after his Prussians surprised the French on 24 May. With the northern flank temporarily stabilised Coburg moved forces south to support Kaunitz, who promptly resigned after being replaced by the Hereditary Prince. Pichegru then took advantage of the weakening of the Allied northern sector to return to the offensive and initiate the Siege of Ypres on 1 June. A series of supinely ineffective counter-attacks by Clerfayt through the first half of June were all beaten off by Souham.

On the Sambre front, after the previous two defeats, the divisions of Desjardin and Charbonnier had decided to capture Charleroi as a fortified base to anchor their position on the north bank, before trying to advance towards Mons. They crossed a third time and besieged Charleroi, but were counterattacked on 3 June by the Prince of Orange at the battle of Gosselies and thrown back across the Sambre.

=== Battle of Fleurus ===
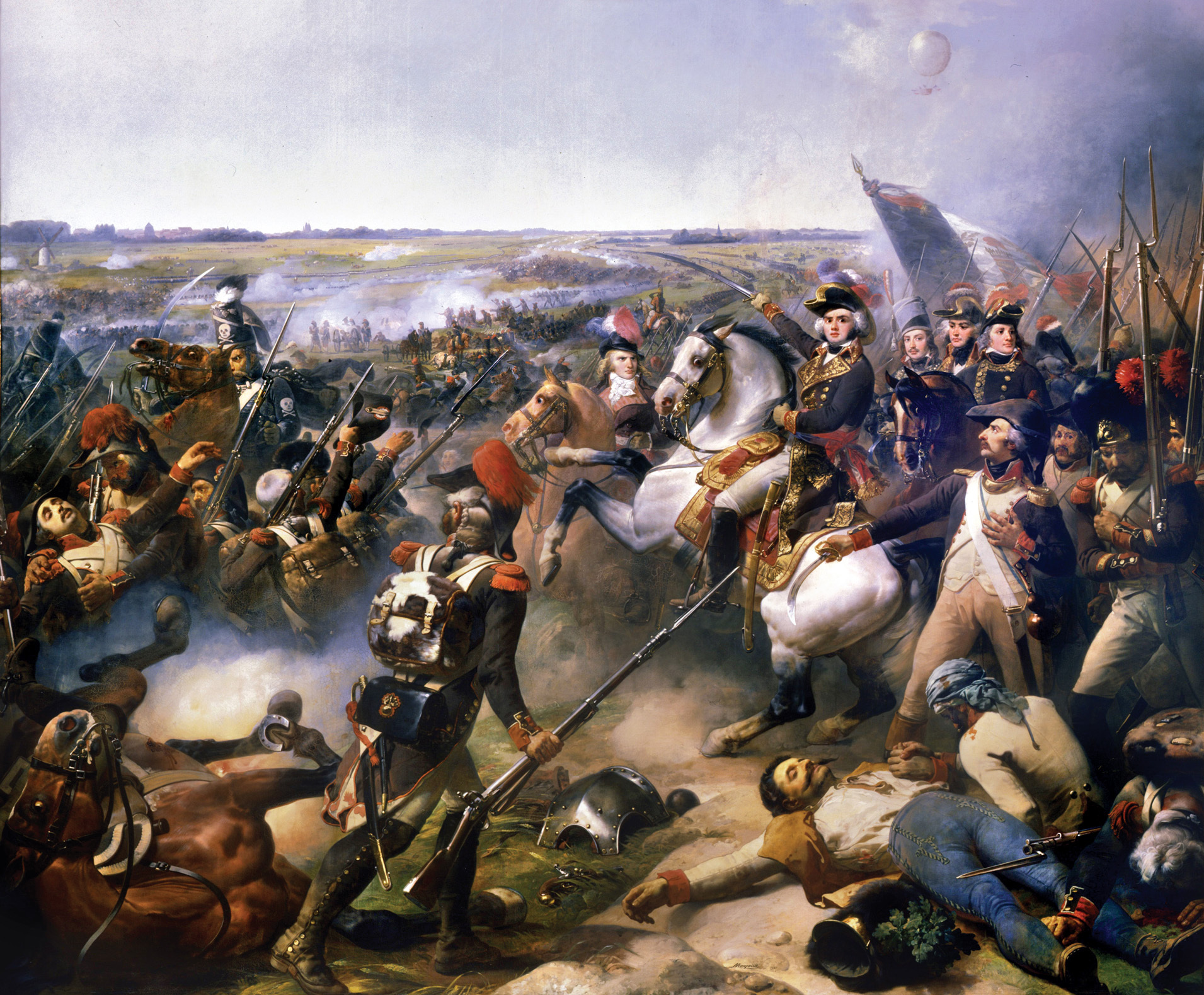
Jourdan at Fleurus with the balloon l'Entreprenant in the background (Jean-Baptiste Mauzaisse 1837; Galerie des Batailles, Palace of Versailles)

At this time, the French were reinforced by four divisions from the Army of the Moselle under Jean-Baptiste Jourdan, who had been ordered to reinforce the army on the Sambre while operating to the southeast against Johann Peter Beaulieu. Jourdan, who then took over command of the entire force, launched a fourth crossing and second siege of Charleroi. At the battle of Lambusart on 16 June, his advancing divisions ran into Orange's attack columns in thick fog. Taken by surprise, the French were forced to retreat.

Not really damaged by Lambusart, the French army crossed the Sambre and attacked again just two days later, on 18 June, catching Coburg by surprise. On this day also, Ypres surrendered to Pichegru. With no further need to relieve Ypres, Coburg decided to concentrate most of his forces on the Sambre instead to drive Jourdan back, leaving York at Tournai and Clerfayt at Deinze to face Pichegru and cover the right. Clerfayt was however soon driven from Deinze and retreated behind Ghent, obliging York to withdraw behind the Scheldt.

Charleroi surrendered to the French a day before Coburg's relief attempt with the main Austrian force. On 26 June, Coburg attacked Jourdan at the Battle of Fleurus. Despite being pushed back at first, Jourdan managed to hold the line and even counterattack at the end of the day. Although the results of the battle were tactically inconclusive, Coburg opted to withdraw after ascertaining that Charleroi had been captured and there was no siege for his army to relieve.
The battle of Fleurus would prove to be the decisive turning point. Historian Digby Smith (1998) noted: 'By this stage of the war the court in Vienna was convinced that it was no longer worth the effort to try to hold on to the Austrian Netherlands and it is suspected that Coburg gave up the chance of a victory here so as to be able to pull out eastwards.'

With French gains in both north and south the Austrians called off the attack before a clear result and retreated north towards Mont St. Jean, then towards Brussels on 1 July when Jourdan's left wing advanced from Charleroi and captured Mons. It was the beginning of an Allied general retreat to the Rhineland and Holland, with the Austrians all but abandoning their 80-year-long control of the Austrian Netherlands. (Note: The Austrian House of Habsburg acquired the Netherlands (the last independent northern provinces being conquered by 1543) in 1477 through marriage, inheriting them definitively in 1482. When the Habsburg empire was split in a Spanish and an Austrian part upon Charles V's abdication in 1556, the Netherlands became Spanish. Between 1598 and 1621, the Southern Netherlands were under Austrian control, whilst the northern provinces had become the de facto independent Dutch Republic as a result of the ongoing Eighty Years' War. The South became Spanish again in 1621, though the North's independence was recognised at the Peace of Münster in 1648. After the War of the Spanish Succession, the Southern Netherlands were once again transferred to Austria (1714), marking the beginning of what is known in historiography as the "Austrian Netherlands".) Thugut's negative influence has been cited as one of the most decisive factors in the loss of the campaign, possibly more important than Tourcoing and Fleurus.

=== Allied retreat from Fleurus to Malines ===
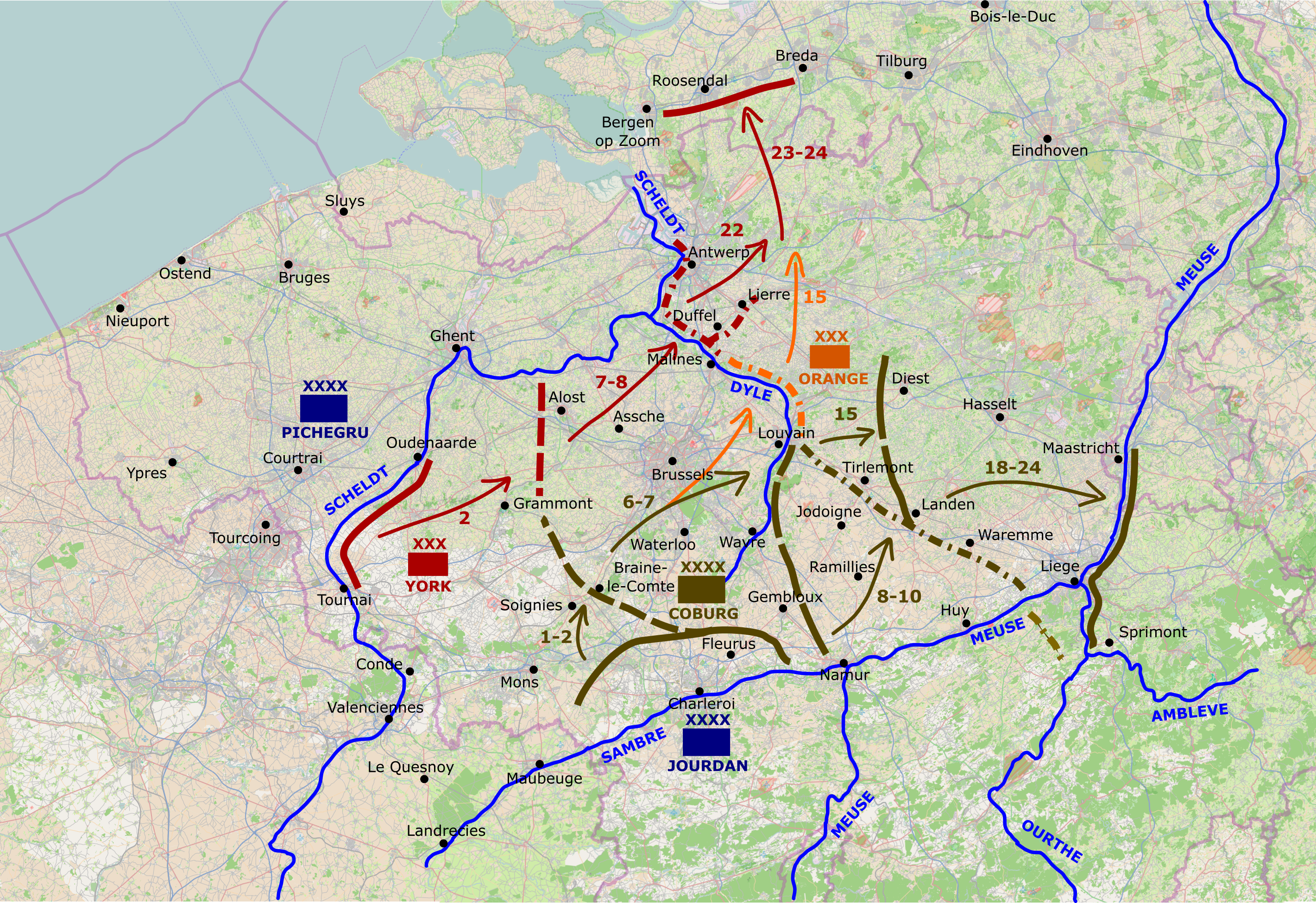
The Allied retreat northwards after the battle of Fleurus. The numbers represent the approximate dates in July during which each stage of the retreat was conducted. York's British-paid troops Coburg's Austrian troops Orange's Dutch troops separating from the main Austrian army Pichegru and Jourdan's French troops

The Allied forces in Flanders were now divided into two distinct groups, the corps of the Duke of York, and the main Austrian and Dutch army under Coburg. While all forces were still nominally under Coburg's command, the two forces essentially functioned separately, with their own respective political objectives, and often without consideration for the other. Where Coburg's concern was to retreat eastward to protect the Rhine river and Germany from the French, York's objective was to retreat north to protect Holland.

Meanwhile, Pichegru's Army of the North had been menacing the Duke of York's forces on the Scheldt at Oudenaarde, but was ordered at the end of June to move to the coast and capture the Flemish ports of Ostend (Oostende), Nieuport (Nieuwpoort) and Sluys (Sluis), then invade Holland. While spared from attack, York was nevertheless compelled to retreat towards Alost (modern Aalst) via Grammont (Geraardsbergen) when the French captured Mons and Soignies on 1 and 2 July respectively, pushing Coburg eastwards and exposing York's left flank and rear.

While York had evacuated every British garrison as part of his retreat, the garrison of Nieuport (Nieuwpoort) had been left in place due to a promise from the British Secretary of War, Henry Dundas, that they would be evacuated by sea. This promise was not kept. Nieuport was besieged, captured on 16 July, and the French emigres in the garrison were massacred by artillery in the town's defensive ditch.

At Waterloo on 5 July, Coburg and York agreed that the Allied army would try to defend a line from Antwerp to Louvain (Leuven), Wavre, Gembloux and Namur. However, the next day, in the face of attacks from Jourdan (whose forces had been officially constituted as the Army of Sambre-and-Meuse on 29 June) all along the line from Braine-le-Comte to Gembloux, Coburg cancelled the agreement and retreated eastwards to Malines (Mechelen) and Louvain, vacating Brussels, and exposing York's left.

On 7 and 8 July, Jourdan attacked Coburg's left wing near Namur, forcing it back to Ramillies and isolating Namur, which he then besieged. Fearing to be cut off from the Meuse, Coburg then retreated his entire army further towards Tirlemont (modern Tienen), prompting York to also retreat further to the Dyle river (modern Dijle) via Malines and Assche.

The Allies were now arrayed with York's 30,000 men guarding the Dyle river from Antwerp to Malines, the Prince of Orange's Dutch army defending from Malines to Louvain, and Coburg's Austrians on a line from Louvain to Tirlemont, Landen, Waremme and the banks of the Meuse, with a further detachment across the river between the Meuse and Ourthe rivers.

Pichegru then occupied Brussels on 10 July, with both his and Jourdan's armies marching through it in victory parades that day.

=== Allied retreat from Malines to Holland and the Meuse ===
Allied commanders
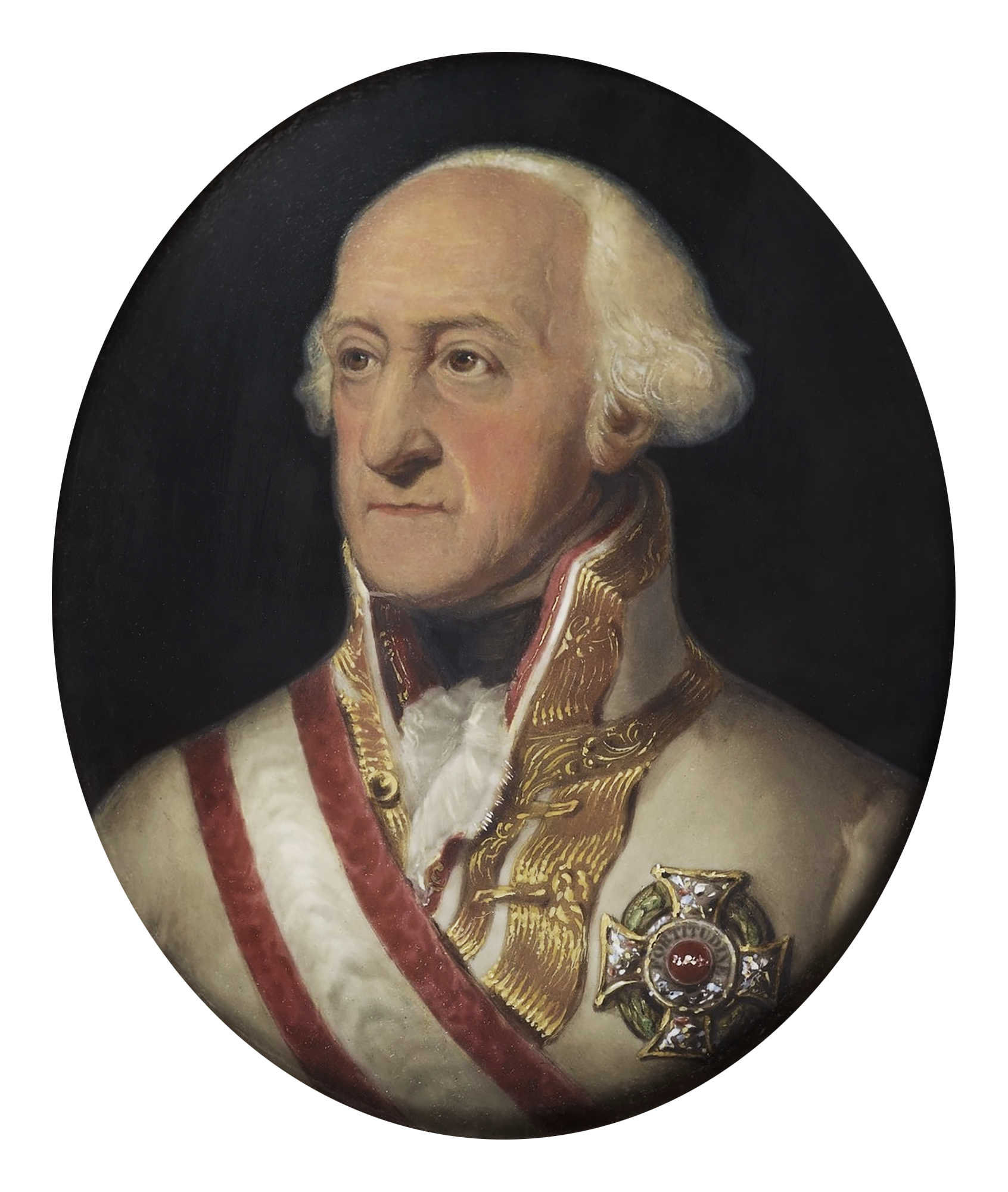
Prince of Saxe-Coburg

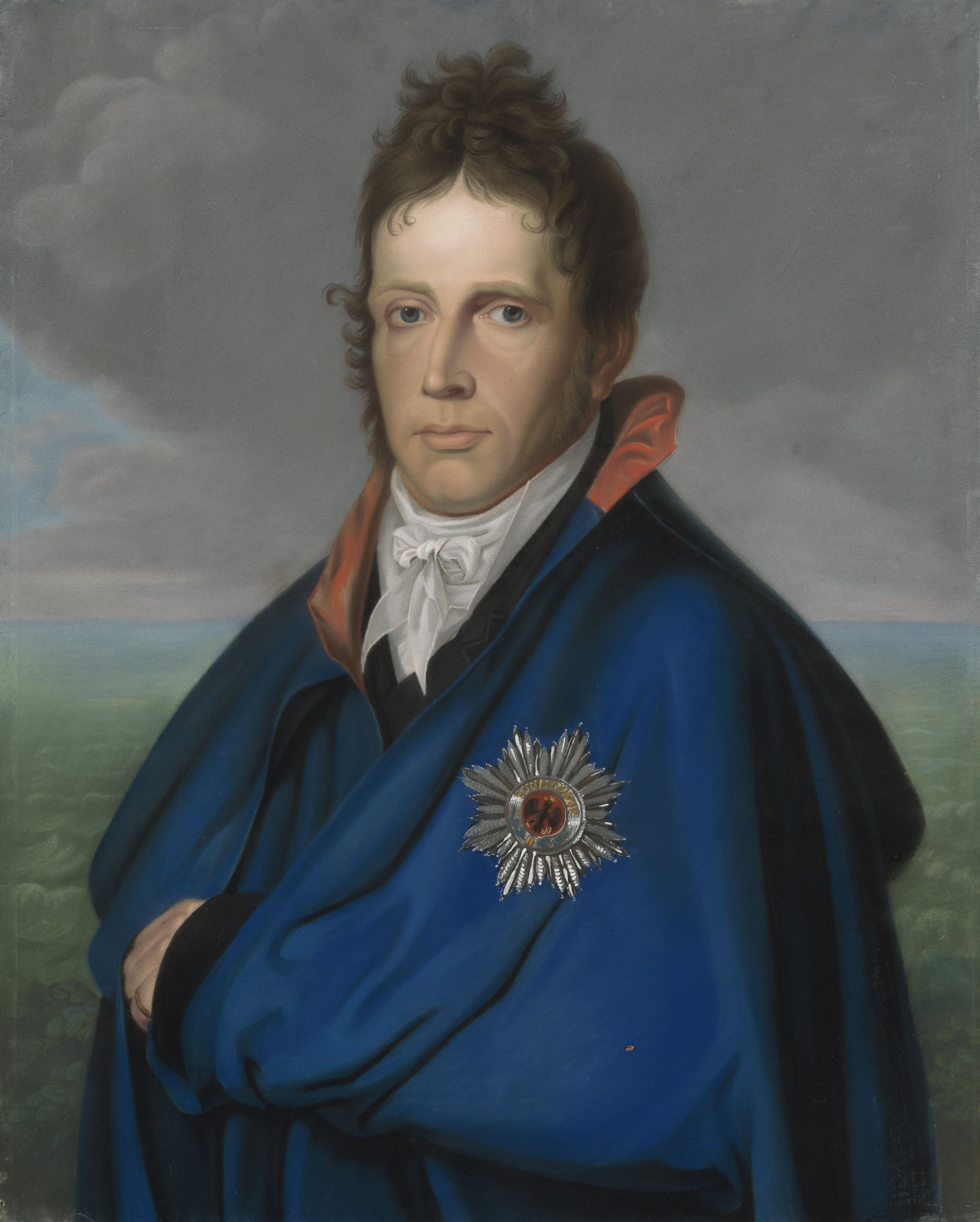
Prince of Orange

Throughout this retreat, the Allies had been not been heavily pressed, in large part due to the fact that Pichegru's army was diverted to the Flanders coast, while Jourdan had been ordered to detach 40,000 men of his approximately 140,000 strong field force under Barthelemy Scherer to recapture the key Austrian fortresses of Landrecies, Le Quesnoy, Valenciennes and Conde (Conde-sur-l'Escaut), in the interior of France, now isolated by the Austrian retreat.

On 12 July, Pichegru advanced against Malines with 18,000 men, while Jourdan advanced against Louvain, Jodoigne and Huy on the Meuse. Pichegru easily captured Malines from York on the 15th, while Jourdan captured Louvain the same day. Jodoigne was reportedly captured sometime before the 17th, and Namur surrendered on 19 July.

When Louvain was taken, the Dutch army retreated northwards towards their homeland, instead of following the Austrians defending the city with them in retreat east to Diest. At this point, the Dutch too began pursuing their own military objectives, separate from Coburg's Austrian army though still ostensibly under his command. With his left flank exposed again, York refused it by drawing it back along the Nethe river from Lierre (Lier) to Duffel, while planning with the Dutch to recapture Malines on the 18th. However, on the 18th itself, York received word from Coburg that he had decided to withdraw his main force even further, from Tirlemont to Landen. Two days later, York realised that Coburg had quietly ordered the Austrians protecting his left flank at Diest to retreat further east to Hasselt, exposing his rear to attack yet again without even informing him.

Coburg's further withdrawal eastward forced York to retreat north again, evacuating Antwerp on 22 July (it was occupied by Pichegru three days later) and retreating north across the Dutch border into Roosendaal on 24 July, the day that Coburg finally retreated across the Meuse (Maas) at Maastricht, taking up position around Fouron-le-Comte ('s-Gravenvoeren). This withdrawal marked the final separation of British and Austrian forces, and an end to even the nominal cooperation that they had before, as the two armies were now each pursuing completely divergent objectives.

On 27 July, the French captured Liège, abolishing the Prince-Bishopric for the third time since 1789, this time for good. The demolition of Saint Lambert's Cathedral, in revolutionary eyes the symbol of clerical power and oppression, was initiated.

=== Second invasion of the Dutch Republic ===
Animation of the Siege of 's-Hertogenbosch (with English subtitles).

In August 1794 a pause in operations fell as the French focused their efforts against the Belgian Channel ports (Sluis fell on 26 August), and York attempted in vain to encourage Austrian support. Under pressure from Britain, the Emperor dismissed Coburg, however his place was filled temporarily by the even more unpopular Clerfayt. After the fall of Le Quesnoy and Landrecies to the French, Pichegru renewed his offensive on the 28th, obliging York to pull back to the line of the Aa River where he was attacked at Boxtel and persuaded to withdraw to the Meuse. On 18 September Clerfayt was defeated at the Battle of Sprimont on the banks of the Ourthe, followed by a further defeat at the hands of Jourdan at the Battle of Aldenhoven on the Roer River on 2 October, causing the Austrians to retreat to the Rhine and finally ending Austrian presence in the Low Countries. Only the garrison in the strong fortress of Luxembourg City remained, but beginning on 22 November, it would be heavily beleaguered for seven months.

By autumn, in the Netherlands the French, including Herman Willem Daendels' Dutch Patriots, had taken Eindhoven and paused their pursuit on the Waal. The Dutch Orangists surrendered 's-Hertogenbosch (Bois-le-Duc) on 12 October after a heavy 3-week siege. York planned a counter-offensive with Austrian assistance to relieve Nijmegen, but this was abandoned when the Hanoverian contingent backed out. On 7 November, after a brief siege, Nijmegen was found to be untenable and the city also abandoned to the French. York made preparations to defend the line of the Waal through the winter but in early December he was recalled to England. In his absence, Hanoverian Lieutenant General Count von Walmoden took charge of the allied army while William Harcourt, commanded the British contingent. At this stage the Prussians were in peace talks with the French, and Austria looked to be ready to follow suit. William Pitt the Younger angrily rejected any suggestion of negotiating with France, but the British position in the Dutch Republic looked increasingly insecure.

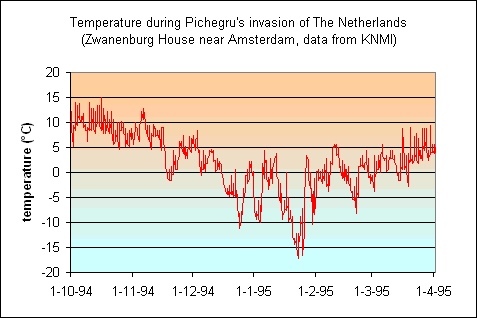
Temperature during the winter of 1794–95.

On 10 December, troops under Herman Willem Daendels assaulted across the Meuse in an unsuccessful attack on Dutch defences in the Bommelerwaard. However, in the days that followed, temperatures plummeted and the rivers Meuse and Waal began to freeze solid, allowing the French to resume their advance. By 28 December the French had occupied the Bommelerwaard and the Lands of Altena. Brigades of Delmas' division, under Herman Willem Daendels and Pierre-Jacques Osten, moving at will, infiltrated the Dutch Water Line and captured fortifications and towns along a twenty-mile front.

== 1795 campaign ==
=== Fall of the Dutch Republic ===
When French vanguard troops crossed the Waal, British and Hessian forces made successful counterattacks at Tuil and Geldermalsen . But on 10 January, Pichegru ordered a general advance across the frozen river between Zaltbommel and Nijmegen and the allies were forced to retreat behind the Lower Rhine. On 15 January, the Anglo-Hanoverian army withdrew from their positions and began a retreat towards Germany, via Amersfoort, Apeldoorn and Deventer, in the face of a fierce blizzard. On 16 January, the city of Utrecht surrendered. Dutch revolutionaries led by Krayenhoff put pressure on the city council of Amsterdam on 18 January to hand over the city, which it did just after midnight, causing a pro-French Batavian Revolution. Earlier that day, stadtholder William V, Prince of Orange and his following had fled to exile in England. Dutch revolutionaries proclaimed the Batavian Republic on 19 January, and in the middle of a grand popular celebration on Dam Square they erected a liberty tree. In the afternoon, French troops entered the city and were cheered on by the people. On 24 January the Capture of the Dutch fleet at Den Helder followed.

=== British evacuation ===
The British continued their retreat eastwards, marching in the face of a severe blizzard, inadequately clothed and half-starved. By Spring 1795 they had left Dutch territory entirely, and reached the port of Bremen, a part of Hanover. There they waited for orders from Britain. Pitt, realizing that any imminent success on the continent was virtually impossible, at last gave the order to withdraw back to Britain, taking with them the remnants of the Dutch, German and Austrian troops that had retreated with them. York's army had lost more than 20,000 men in the two years of fighting. On the embarkation of the most of British Army for England in April 1795 a small corps under Major General Dundas remained on the Continent until December the same year. The surrender of Luxembourg on 7 June 1795 concluded the French conquest of the Low Countries, thus marking the end of the Flanders campaign.

== Aftermath ==
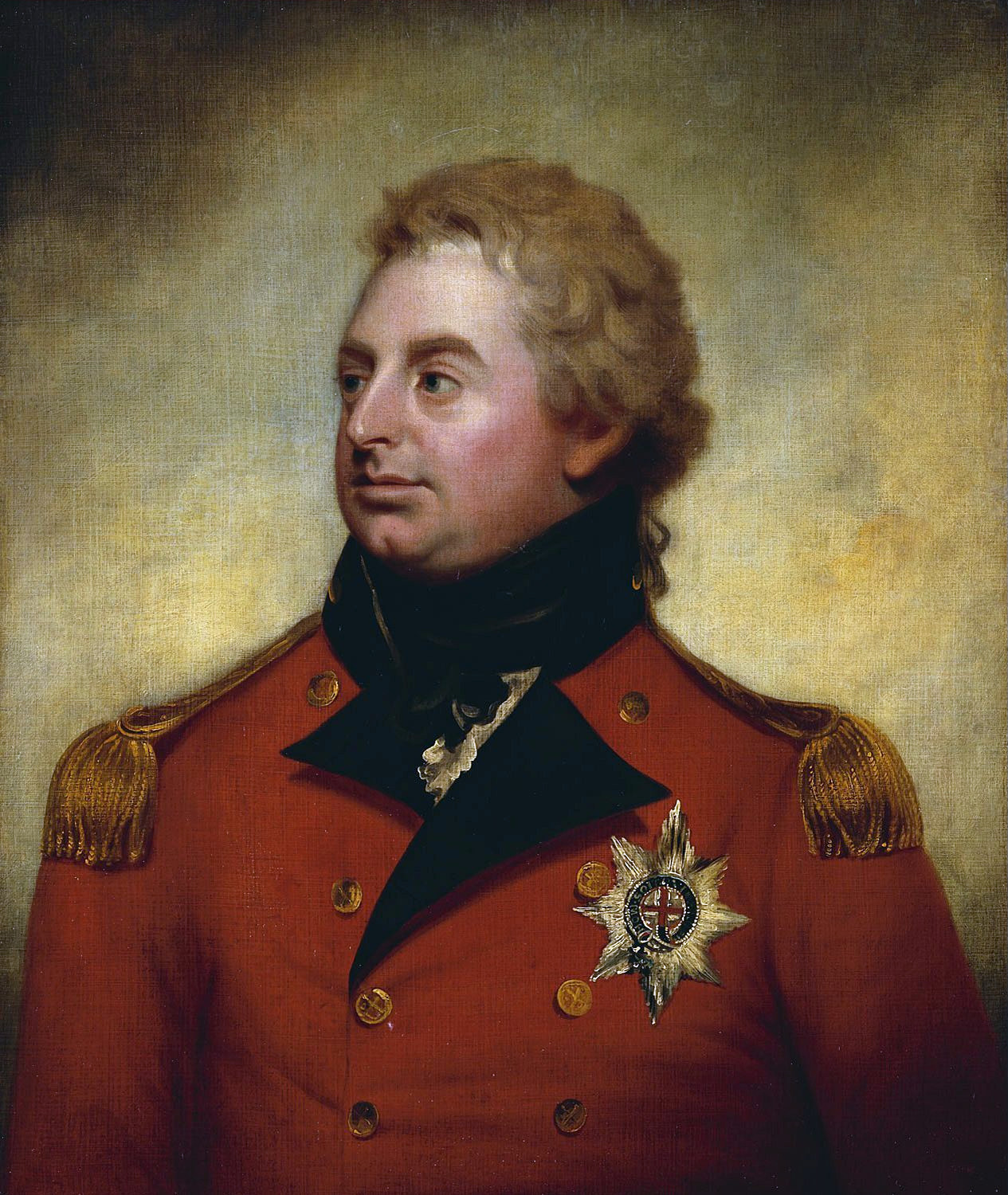
The Duke of York led British forces and the campaign is often popularly associated with him.

For the British and the Austrians the campaign proved disastrous. Austria had lost one of its territories, the Austrian Netherlands (largely constituting modern Belgium and Luxembourg), while the British had lost their closest ally on the European continent – the Dutch Republic. It would be more than twenty years before a friendly pro-British government was installed in The Hague again. Prussia, too, had abandoned the Prince of Orange who it had saved in 1787, and already signed a separate peace with France on 5 April, surrendering all its own possessions on the west Rhine bank (Prussian Guelders, Moers and half of Cleves). The Coalition fell apart even further when Spain admitted having lost the War of the Pyrenees, and defecting to the French side. Although Austria would continue its Rhine Campaigns successfully, it never regained foothold in the Southern Netherlands, and was continuously defeated by French forces under Napoleon in Northern Italy. It finally sued for peace in 1797 at Campo Formio, acknowledging the French conquest of the Netherlands.

In the British popular imagination York was widely portrayed as an incompetent dilettante, whose lack of military knowledge had led to disaster. The campaign led to his ridicule in popular culture. Some historians such as Alfred Burne (1949) and Richard Glover (2008) strongly challenge this characterisation, and York's defeat did not stop him from holding future military commands, including a long tenure as Commander-in-Chief of the Army (1795–1809; 1811–1827).

There were several reasons for the Allied failure in the campaign. Varying and conflicting objectives of the commanders, poor coordination between the various nations, appalling conditions for the troops, and outside interference from civilian politicians such as Henry Dundas for the British and Thugut for the Empire. Also towards the end of the campaign in particular the gradual confidence and flexibility of the French armies compared to the more professional but outdated Allied forces became apparent.

The campaign demonstrated the numerous weaknesses of the British army after years of neglect, and a massive programme of reform was instigated by York in his new role as Commander-in-Chief. While it performed strongly on many occasions, the Austrian army was plagued by the timidity and the conservatism of its commanders, whose movements were often very slow and inconclusive.

Both the British and the Austrians abandoned the Low Countries as their major theatre of operations, a drastic switch in strategy as it had previously been their main theatre in other European wars. Britain instead decided to use its maritime power to strike against French colonies in the West Indies. The Austrians now made the Italian front their main line of defence. Britain did briefly attempt to undertake an invasion of the Batavian Republic in 1799, again under the Duke of York, but this swiftly foundered and they were forced to conclude the Convention of Alkmaar and withdraw again.

== Legacy ==
In Britain one of the lasting associations with the campaign is the nursery rhyme "The Grand Old Duke of York", though it existed at least 200 years before the War. Alfred Burne mentions a virtually identical rhyme The King of France went up the Hill recorded in 1594. There remains some considerable debate whether the rhyme refers to the later 1799 Helder campaign when York again led a British army into the Low Countries.

For the British, lessons received in the campaign led to widespread army reforms on all levels, spearheaded by the Duke of York as Commander-in-Chief. The tight, professional army that later served in the Peninsular War was created on the foundation of lessons learned in 1794.

The Allies would not see such an opportunity to topple the new French regime again until 1814. For Austria and the Empire, the loss of the Austrian Netherlands was to have long-term effects as Republican domination in this region put a tremendous pressure on the order of the Holy Roman Empire, and was an instrumental factor in its later collapse in 1806. French control of the Netherlands enabled its armies to penetrate deep into Germany over the following years and later enabled Napoleon to establish the Continental System. For the French too, victory in the field served to solidify the perilous state of government at home. Following this campaign, the Army of the Sambre et Meuse became the chief offensive force, while the Armée du Nord was reduced to largely garrison status. Of the commanders, Coburg would never serve in the field again, nor too Pichegru who became discredited and later died in prison after involvement in plotting against Napoleon. The Duke of York was to lead a second expedition to Holland in the Helder Campaign in 1799, but after its failure was to remain as Commander-in-Chief at the Horse Guards for the rest of his career. The Hereditary Prince would have a checkered military career in the British (Helder 1799, Wight 1800), Prussian (Jena 1806) and Austrian (Wagram 1809) armies, before becoming king of the Kingdom of the United Netherlands in 1815, where a reconstituted Dutch army fought under his son, another Prince of Orange, in the Waterloo Campaign.

Many officers who would later rise to prominence received their baptism of fire on the fields of Flanders, including several of Napoleon's marshals – Bernadotte, Jourdan, Ney, MacDonald, Murat and Mortier. For the Austrians the Archduke Charles was given his first command there after replacing the wounded Alvinczi in 1794, while in the Hanoverian army Scharnhorst first saw action under the Duke of York.

In the British Army, the most notable debut was Arthur Wellesley's (the future Duke of Wellington), who joined with his regiment the 33rd Regiment of Foot late in 1794 and served at the Battle of Boxtel. He was to draw on these experiences during his own later more successful campaigns in India and the Peninsular War.

Bernard Cornwell's fictitious hero, Richard Sharpe, says his first battle was the Battle of Boxtel.

== Bibliography ==
- Burne, Alfred (1949), The Noble Duke of York: The Military Life of Frederick Duke of York and Albany, London: Staples Press
- Fortescue, Sir John (1918). British Campaigns in Flanders 1690–1794 (extracts from Volume 4 of A History of the British Army). London: Macmillan and co.
- Fremont-Barnes, Gregory (2006). The Encyclopedia of the French Revolutionary and Napoleonic Wars: A Political, Social, and Military History, Volume 1. ABC-CLIO. p. 488. ISBN 9781851096466.
- "Various entries". Encarta Encyclopedie Winkler Prins (in Dutch). Microsoft Corporation/Het Spectrum. 2002.
- Glover, Richard (2008), Peninsular Preparation: The Reform of the British Army 1795–1809, Cambridge University Press
- Guthrie, William (1798). A New geographical, historical and commercial grammar and present state of the several kingdoms of the world, 1. printed for Charles Dilly ... and G.G. and J. Robinson. p. 473. ISBN 9780665188862.
- Harvey, Robert (2007). War of Wars: The Epic Struggle Between Britain and France 1789–1815. London: Robinson. ISBN 978-1-84529-635-3.
- Hayworth, Jordan R. (2015). Conquering the Natural Frontier: French Expansion to the Rhine River During the War of the First Coalition, 1792–1797. Denton, Texas: University of North Texas Libraries, UNT Digital Library. p. 494. doi:10.12794/metadc822845.
- Holmes, Richard (2003), Wellington: The Iron Duke, London: Harper Collins, ISBN 0-00-713748-6.
- Kossmann, Ernst Heinrich (1986). De Lage Landen 1780–1980 (2 delen). Amsterdam: Agon. p. 478. ISBN 90-5157-043-0. (dbnl.org e-book)
- Lacey, James (2016). Great Strategic Rivalries: From The Classical World to the Cold War. Oxford: Oxford University Press. p. 592. ISBN 9780190620486.
- Phipps, Ramsay Weston (1926), The Armies of the First French Republic and the Rise of the Marshals of Napoleon I, London: Oxford University Press
- Rodger, N. A. M. (2007), Command of the Ocean: A Naval History of Britain, 1649–1815, London: Penguin Books, ISBN 978-0-14-102690-9.
- Schama, S. (1977). Patriots and Liberators. Revolution in the Netherlands 1780–1813. New York: Vintage Books. ISBN 0-679-72949-6..
- Smith, Digby (1998). The Greenhill Napoleonic Wars Data Book: Actions and Losses in Personnel, Colours, Standards and Artillery, 1792–1815. Mechanicsburg, Pennsylvania: Stackpole Books. ISBN 1-85367-276-9.
- Urban, Mark (2005), Generals: Ten British Commanders Who Shaped the World, London: Faber and Faber, ISBN 0-571-22485-7.
- Vetch, Robert Hamilton (1899), "Vandeleur, John Ormsby" , in Lee, Sidney (ed.), Dictionary of National Biography, vol. 58, London: Smith, Elder & Co, pp. 97–98
