= Battle of Boxtel =

1794 battle during the War of the First Coalition

- Part of the Flanders campaign in the War of the First Coalition
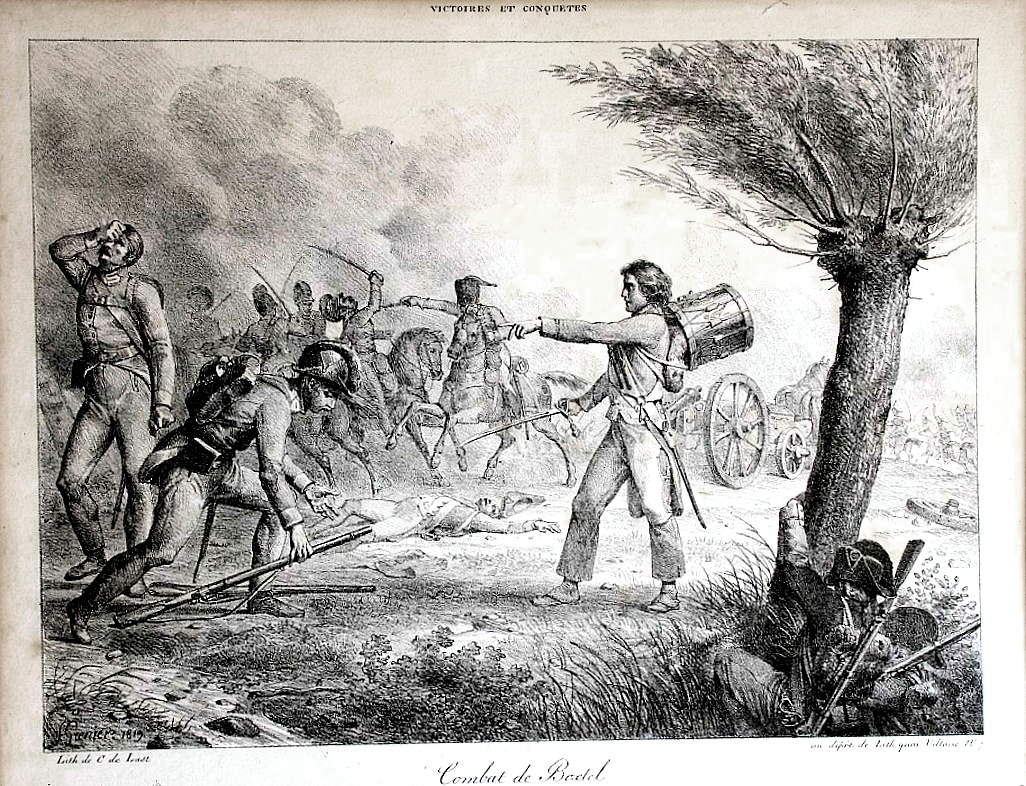
- The Combat of Boxtel 1794
Date	14–15 September 1794
Location	Boxtel, Netherlands 51°35′N 5°20′E
Result	French victory

Belligerents
France	Great Britain; Hesse-Kassel; Hesse-Darmstadt

Commanders and leaders
(France) Jean-Charles Pichegru (France) Antoine Guillaume Delmas	(Kingdom of Great Britain) Duke of York (Kingdom of Great Britain) Ralph Abercromby (Kingdom of Great Britain) Arthur Wellesley (Note: A brigade commander under Abercromby) (Hesse) Georg von Düring

Strength
~10,000	Unknown total. The numbers include: • Abercromby's division • Düring's force (1,500)
- Location within Europe

The Battle of Boxtel was fought in the Duchy of Brabant on 14–15 September 1794, during the War of the First Coalition. It was part of the Flanders campaign of 1793–94 in which mainly British, Dutch and Austrian troops had attempted to launch an invasion of France through Flanders. The battle was won by the French troops. In it, the Hessians and then the British under the Duke of York were overwhelmed under pressure from the French under General Pichegru, but the British retreated in good order; the total casualties in the battle on both sides remain unknown. It is often remembered as being the debut action of Arthur Wellesley, who later became the 1st Duke of Wellington.

== Background ==
For almost two years the combined Coalition army under the overall command of the Duke of Saxe-Coburg had struggled against the Republican French armies in attempts to invade France from the north through Flanders. The Coalition had initially been successful but following rebuffs at Tourcoing and Fleurus, by the summer of 1794 the balance had turned and the allies began to retreat northwards, pursued by an increasingly resurgent French army led by Jean-Charles Pichegru. By 24 July the Allies had separated, with the Austrian forces under Clerfayt withdrawing with ever greater haste towards Liége, obliging the now independent Anglo-Hanoverian contingent under the Duke of York to pull back across the Dutch frontier.

On 29 July York's forces took up a new position defending the line of the River Aa, from 's-Hertogenbosch south eastwards towards the Peel morass. Outposts were placed eight miles in advance on the River Dommel, one of the chief of these being some 1,500 men under Hesse-Darmstadt Major General Georg von Düring at the small town of Boxtel, consisting of two Hessian infantry battalions (Leib Grenadiers and Landgraf regiments), two companies of Jägers, two cannon, two squadrons of British 15th Light Dragoons (under Lt. Colonel George Churchill), four squadrons of Irvine's York Hussars and two squadrons each of Hompesch and Choiseul Hussars. Nearby outposts consisted of the Hesse-Kassel infantry and a cavalry contingent (one battalion and five squadrons) at Ollaud under Major General Karl von Linsingen, and further still to Düring's left at St. Oedenrode, the Hanoverian Corps and the remainder of the British light cavalry under Major General Rudolf von Hammerstein.

== The battle ==
On 14 September Pichegru, wishing to secure the line of the Dommel as he besieged Breda, sent a French force under Antoine Delmas, variously described as a division or "a strong party of observation" – perhaps 10,000 men – to occupy Boxtel. This force advanced from Oisterwijk and fell upon the Hessian piquets at around 3 pm, forcing these back to the other side of the Dommel, but were unable to seize the bridges near Boxtel, which were broken down by the defenders. Similarly, further to the east:

They arrived on the plain in front of St. Oedenrode with a superior cavalry force, and an infantry column on the road from Beest, whose strength could not be ascertained because of the intersected and closed terrain. Our outposts were immediately pushed back to the main pickets, and the enemy attacked with two columns. They could not make much progress, because of the resistance offered by the pickets... they tried to take these [bridges], but were prevented from doing this by the heavy and effective fire of the Hanoverian Jäger and the Loyal Emigrés, supported by an amusette.

Though the French captured the bridge at Nijnsel, the Hessians defended their outposts east of Boxtel until around 6 pm, when Chef d'Escadron Jacob Marulaz, at the head of 30 troopers of the 8th Hussars, was able to cross a ford west of St. Oedenrode, "partly by swimming, and partly by rafts". This force swept behind the Hessian positions at Boxtel, attacked the infantry in the rear and quickly overran them. The two infantry battalions surrendered or were cut down, while the allied cavalry, which was unable to form up in the narrow streets, were driven off towards Middelrode. The Hessian losses were around 300 infantry, some 50 men each for Irwine's and Hompesch's cavalry, plus the two cannon.

Lieutenant Powell of the British 14th Foot was with his unit at the village of Middelrode and reports how:

We met Unwin's (Irwine's) Hussars coming in as hard as they could gallop, with swords drawn, saying that all the troops that were at Boxtel had been cut to pieces, except them & they owed their safety to their horses, (which I believe very true & with their own inclination for they had not the least wish to stay with (us) which they ought to have done, nor do I believe there was a single man wounded.

The French advance also came up against Hammerstein's Hanoverian force to the east of Düring's command, but were repulsed by a charge from the Salm Hussars and British light dragoons. Nevertheless, after realising what had occurred at Boxtel, Hammerstein thought it prudent to withdraw his command to Erp to protect his flanks.

On learning of the fate of Düring at Boxtel, the Duke of York ordered Lieutenant General Sir Ralph Abercromby to recover the town with a sizable force. The task was given to the Guards and 3rd Brigades, which consisted of the 12th (Suffolk) Regiment, 33rd (1st Yorkshire West Riding) Regiment, 42nd Royal Highland Regiment and the 44th (East Essex) Regiment – two brigades of ten battalions in total, supported by ten squadrons of cavalry. Abercromby advanced boldly through the night, but on approaching the town at dawn came up against what he believed to be superior opposition. After some skirmishing, during which some 15 men were killed, the attack was halted while he referred back to York for further instructions. The Duke reiterated that he persist in the assault, but at this point Abercromby learned of possible enemy movements to his left flank, and disregarding his instructions to attack, gave the order to withdraw. This action on the part of Abercromby has been harshly criticised by Burne. Abercromby had very poor eyesight, before any serious engagement had started he appears to have withdrawn on the basis of rumour, in fact the ragtag French force, far from being superior could not have been any greater in number than his own command, which included the cream of the British Army. Also he must have known Hammerstein's Hanoverian command was supporting on the left.

Then followed some disorder as the retreating infantry became mixed up with the cavalry squadrons as they approached the village of Schyndel. Seeing this, French cavalry deployed for a charge but were driven off by the muskets of the 33rd Foot, commanded by Sir John Sherbrooke, which enabled the rest of the force to withdraw.

The following account was dictated to Sherbrooke's daughter-in-law in 1830, the year of his death. This stated that Wellesley commanded the 33rd at Boxtel, Wellesley had in fact been given overall command of the 3rd Brigade. On 19 September 1794 Wellesley had written to his older brother Richard The Earl of Mornington, telling him Abercromby had conveyed on him the thanks of the Duke of York "to the 33rd for their good conduct on the 15th".

When he (Sherbrooke) had obtained the rank of Lt-Col., he served under the Duke of York in Flanders, and during this unfortunate and memorable retreat, the 33rd was appointed to cover it... Two regiments of French Cavalry were seen coming down with the intention of charging the 33rd ... Col. Sherbrooke faced his Regt to the rear and gave the word 33rd 'Steady'. In this awful crisis not a man moved, but with determined fortitude they awaited the attack. When the first French Regt. was within 50 yards the command was given to Fire!' – the steady coolness of the men gave it full effect... men and horses were precipitated to the ground – those who were neither unhorsed nor wounded, halted and attempted to retreat, but before they had gained a very short distance a second volley completed the work of destruction and the whole Regt. lay stretched on the ground. The second Regt witnessing the dreadful over-throw faced about and were seen no more. This brilliant action Sir John (Sherbrooke) always declared was more satisfactory to him, and he took more pride in it, than any affair in which he was ever engaged.

== Aftermath ==
On his return to camp Abercromby gave his report. A council-of-war was held, where the fateful decision was made to abandon the strong defensive position of the Aa and fall back beyond the Meuse, effectively abandoning the fortresses of Bergen, Breda and Bois-le-Duc to their fate.

For the French, the unexpected windfall of Boxtel was a complete surprise. However, Pichegru made no attempt to capitalise on it, instead turning aside to besiege Breda. Boxtel can therefore be seen as a crucial turning point for the British Army in this campaign – until this stage, all the withdrawals could be and were blamed on the overall strategy of the Austrian high command, morale remained high within the British ranks. However the mistake at Boxtel and unnecessary abandonment of the strong defensive line of the Aa was entirely the responsibility of British paid troops and British commanders. From this point on, despondency set in and faith in the command of the Duke of York was eroded. On 23 November he was recalled by Pitt.

The British were able to continue their retreat northwards under the command of William Harcourt and eventually, after much hardship, reached the North Sea coast successfully, where they were withdrawn to Britain in 1795. The French pressed on to Amsterdam and overthrew the Dutch Republic, replacing it with a satellite state, the Batavian Republic.

== Archaeology ==
As the action was a relatively minor combat the exact location was under conjecture for many years. A memorial was placed by the Boxtel Historical Society in a field on the West of the town as it was assumed the Republican advance came from that direction; there is a contemporary reference that one building known as the Barrier House on Steen Weg was burned (now the site of No. 37 Clarissen Straat). However in 2011, 55 lead musket balls and other artefacts were unearthed to the East of Stapelen Castle, South-East of Boxtel town, which are thought to date to the period of the battle. It's now theorised that the bulk of the fighting surrounding Düring's command then must have taken place south east of the town.

== In popular culture ==
The battle led to one of several accounts of why British troops are called "Tommies." Supposedly a dying private, Tommy Atkins, said to Wellington, "It’s all right, sir, all in a day’s work." Impressed, the Duke later used the name as a generic term for common soldiers.

The battle of Boxtel was the first battle of Richard Sharpe, protagonist of the Sharpe novels. The battle is cited in Sharpe's Tiger, when Sharpe is a private in Wellesley's regiment, and also in Sharpe's Eagle.

== Bibliography ==
- The Field of Mars, Being an Alphabetical Digestion of the Principal Naval and Military Engagements, In Europe, Asia, Africa and America... Vol 2 (1801), MEU...MID unpaginated.
- Urban, Mark, Generals: Ten British Commanders Who Shaped the World. Faber and Faber, 2005
- Wills, Garry David, Wellington's First Battle, 2011
- Burne, Alfred H. The Noble Duke of York, Staples Press, London, 1949
- The Diary of Lieu Thomas Powell, 14th Foot. As prepared for publication in The White Rose, with Added Information on his Services etc. p. 30 (NAM)
