= Battle of Limburg (1792) =

Battle of the War of the First Coalition

Coordinates: 50°23′N 8°4′E

- Part of War of the First Coalition
| Date | 9 November 1792 |
| Location | Limburg an der Lahn, Hesse |
| Result | French victory |

Belligerents
| (French First Republic) Republican France | Kingdom of Prussia |

Commanders and leaders
| (French First Republic) Jean Nicolas Houchard | (Kingdom of Prussia) Charles William Ferdinand, Duke of Brunswick-Wolfenbüttel |

Strength
| Advance Guard of Adam Philippe, Comte de Custine's army, approximately 4,000 | 1 Grenadier Battalion (Kenitz), 1,200 men |

Casualties and losses
| Unknown | 170 dead, wounded or missing |

The Battle of Limburg, also called the Battle of Friedberg, was a battle of the War of the First Coalition, itself part of the French Revolutionary Wars. It took place on 9 November 1792 at Limburg an der Lahn between French Revolutionary forces and Prussian troops, ending in a French victory.

== Battle ==
While the Austrians saw themselves on the eve of losing their possessions in Belgium, the Prussian army, which had scarcely escaped from France, hastened to the aid of the Palatinate invaded by French General Adam Philippe, Comte de Custine. After having protected Koblenz by leaving a division there, Prussian field marshal Charles William Ferdinand, Duke of Brunswick-Wolfenbüttel settled in and around Limburg, where he considered himself well-situated to block French progress. On 8 November Custine ordered Colonel Jean Nicolas Houchard to assemble all his detachments and to attack the Prussians in Limburg. (Note: The French order of battle is incomplete, but it is known that Houchard commanded one battalion of the Volontaires Grenadiers, three squadrons of the 2nd Chasseurs à cheval, and two squadrons of the 2nd Cavalry regiment of Custine's advanced guard. See Smith, p. 28.) Louis Dominique Munnier was to support the attack with his corps.

Houchard surprised the Prussians, who, believing themselves safe in Limburg, had established negligible defenses. The French quietly installed their batteries before the enemy even thought of defending themselves. Nevertheless, after some hesitation, the Prussians brought out their troops, who threw themselves into battle, sowing some confusion. French artillery fire forced them to retreat. The French expelled the Prussians from the city; they retreated to Montabaur, while the French fortified their positions. The entire battle took 90 minutes.

== Bibliography ==
- (in French) Victoires, conquêtes, désastres, revers et guerres civiles des Français Tome 7
- (in French) Mémoires de Custine

== Notes, citations and sources ==
=== Sources cited ===
- Dodge, Theodore Ayrault (2011). Warfare in the Age of Napoleon: The Revolutionary Wars Against the First Coalition in Northern Europe and the Italian Campaign, 1789-1797. USA: Leonaur Ltd. ISBN 978-0-85706-598-8.
- Phipps, Ramsay Weston (2011). The Armies of the First French Republic: Volume II The Armées du Moselle, du Rhin, de Sambre-et-Meuse, de Rhin-et-Moselle. USA: Pickle Partners Publishing. ISBN 978-1-908692-25-2.
- Smith, Digby (1998). The Napoleonic Wars Data Book. London: Greenhill. ISBN 1-85367-276-9.
