= Battle of Menin (1793) =

Battle of the War of the First Coalition

Coordinates: 50.7956°N 3.1217°E

Battle of Wervik (1793)
- Part of the French Revolutionary Wars
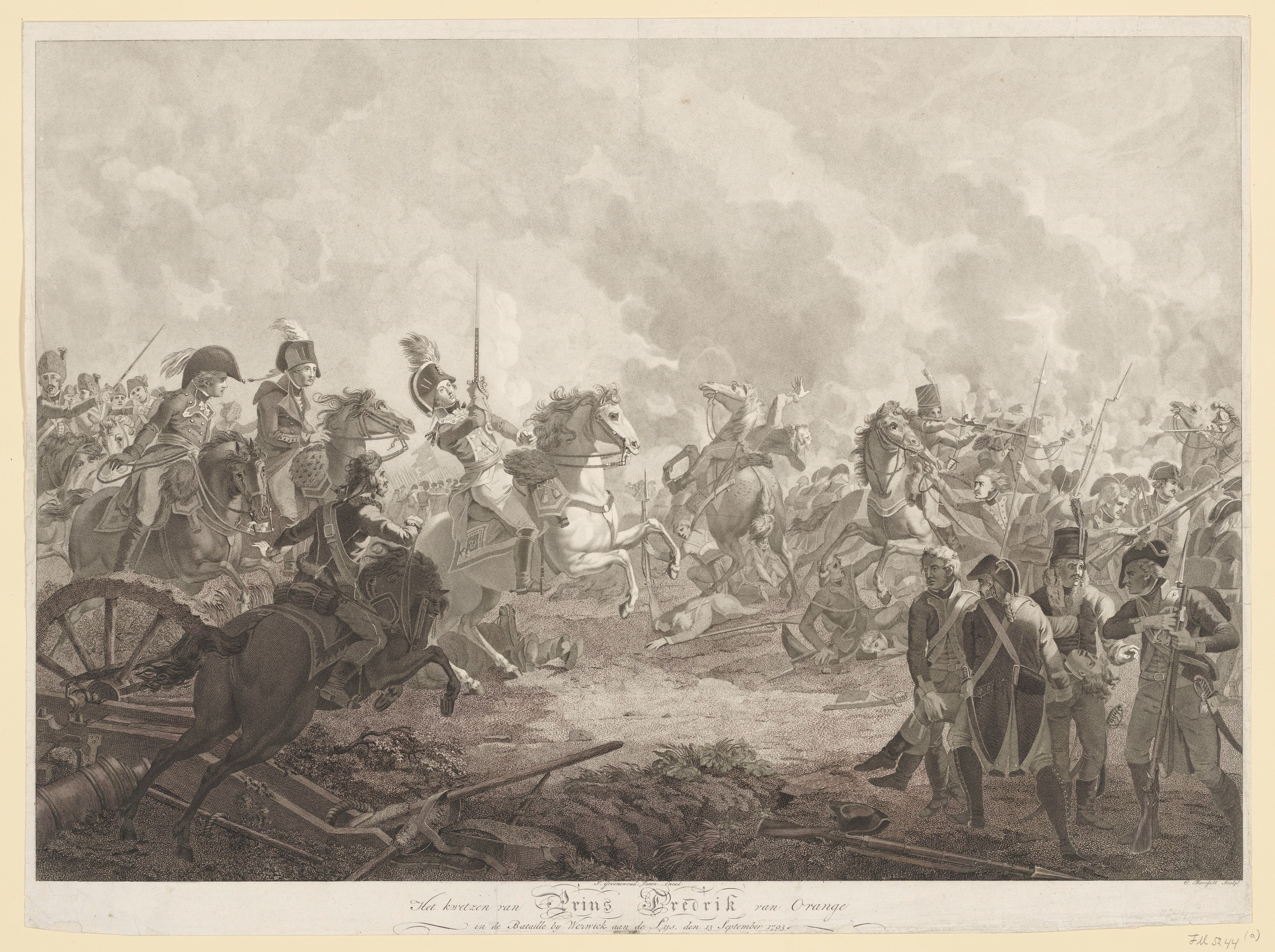
- Prince Frederick of Orange-Nassau is wounded at the battle
Date	12–13 September 1793
Location	Wervik and Menen, Flanders
Result	French victory

Belligerents
France	Dutch Republic; Austria

Commanders and leaders
Jean Houchard	Prince William of Orange

Strength
27,000–30,000	13,000

Casualties and losses
600–1,500	1,550–3,100; 40 guns

The Battle of Wervik or of Wervik and Menin was fought on 12 and 13 September 1793 between 30,000 men of the French Army of the North commanded by Jean Nicolas Houchard, and 13,000 Coalition troops: the Veldleger (mobile army) of the Dutch States Army, commanded by William, Hereditary Prince of Orange and his brother Prince Frederick of Orange-Nassau, and a few squadrons of Austrian cavalry under Pál Kray, seconded by Johann Peter Beaulieu. The great superiority in numbers being on the French side the battle ended in a victory for France, with the Dutch army suffering many losses. Among the casualties was Prince Frederick, who was wounded in the shoulder at Wervik, an injury from which he never fully recovered. The combat occurred during the Flanders Campaign of the War of the First Coalition. Menen is a city in Belgium located on the French border about 100 km (62 mi) west of Brussels.

After his victory in the Battle of Hondschoote, the French commander Jean Nicolas Houchard decided to fall on the Dutch forces defending Menen. About 27,000 French troops advanced on Menen from two directions - northwards from Lille toward Menen and eastwards along the north bank of the Leie (Lys) River toward Wervik and Menen. The Dutch defenders held their own on 12 September. On 13 September the French won a significant victory, forcing the Dutch to withdraw to Deinze. Two days later, the French were beaten by Beaulieu in the Battle of Courtrai and abandoned Menen. Despite his recent successes, Houchard was charged with treason and executed.

== Background ==
In the Summer of 1793 the Coalition forces had split, with the British army besieging Dunkirk under the Duke of York, and the Austrians under the Prince of Coburg investing Le Quesnoy. The States Army under the Hereditary Prince was left to guard a long line along the Leie (Lys) river, based on Wervik and Menen (Menin), protecting the lines of communication between two allied armies, for which task it was overextended. The Dutch commander repeatedly asked for reinforcements from his Allies, but these requests were denied. After the Battle of Hondschoote from 6 to 8 September 1793 the British were forced to raise the Siege of Dunkirk, and to fall back upon Veurne (Furnes), thereby exposing the Dutch right flank, which was in danger of being turned at Ypres.

The British retreat did not turn into a rout, because Houchard did not pursue them energetically enough, according to later French military commentators. Instead of following in the direction of Veurne he turned sharply right on 10 September, following a plan that Lazare Carnot, the member of the Committee of Public Safety who had special responsibility for the conduct of the war, had laid down in a letter of 5 September. The plan had as objective the relief of Le Quesnoy which was still holding out. Houchard was to march on Tournai and take the fortress. Had to defeat the Dutch troops around Menen as they would otherwise threaten his left flank near Tournai.

The Dutch troops had retreated from Ypres, as this was considered indefensible for lack of provisions and toward Menen and Halluin, where they concentrated. A further retreat toward Kortrijk was contemplated and set in motion on 10 September but on the way the Hereditary Prince was informed that Coburg had succeeded in forcing the capitulation of Le Quesnoy, and therefore was able to detach a force of 14,000 Austrians under Beaulieu to reinforce the Dutch along the Leie. This convinced the Dutch commander to remain in position.

Houchard knew the Dutch dispositions, on the right flank, the Prince of Hesse-Darmstadt occupied Wervik and Comines. In the center the Hereditary Prince held Menen with 6,000 men with 4 battalions under Wartensleben pushed forward into Roncq and Halluin. On the left flank the Prussians of Von Geusau and Reitzenstein occupied Tourcoing and Lannoy. Houchard ordered Antoine Anne Lecourt de Béru to Bailleul to meet up with Joseph de Hédouville who marched there with his troops from Houthem by way of Poperinge. Pierre Marie Joseph Salomon Dumesny was already there on 11 September.

The three French generals lost valuable time at Bailleul in preparation but their presence remained hidden from the Dutch. This was also evidenced by the narrative of De Bas, representing the Dutch perspective, who reported the French attack as a complete surprise. In the morning of 12 September, two columns of French troops under Dumesny and Hédouville finally left Bailleul for Menen, marching along the left bank of the Leie.

At Bailleul, Dumesny's division counted 10,000 troops and Hédouville's division numbered 6,500 men, including foot chasseurs led by Claude-Sylvestre Colaud. These troops advanced east along the north bank of the Leie toward Wervik, forming the left prong of the French attack. Béru's division with 10,000–11,000 soldiers moved north from the camps near Lille, forming the right prong. The Lille division was split into a left column under Jacques MacDonald, a center column led by Béru and a right column under Pierre Dupont.

== The battle ==
The evening of 12 September strong French detachments had already reached the woods around Bousbecque and Roncq (where they surprised an outpost of the Dutch regiment "Van Brakel," with a loss 40 men), while Beaulieu arrived at the Leie with six squadrons of cavalry and six battalions of infantry (not the hoped-for 14,000, but still about 8,000 men). Here the Hereditary Prince personally welcomed him and led him across the Leie to a camp near Wevelgem, where the Austrians stayed overnight. Meanwhile, Dutch troops forced the French vanguard, advancing in two columns toward Menen and Halluin, back near Halluin. In these skirmishes the Prince of Hesse-Darmstadt was severely wounded.

Early the next morning, 13 September, Houchard started a three-pronged attack by launching columns under generals Hédouville, Béru, and Dumesny toward the Dutch positions. Informed about the attack, the Hereditary Prince asked Beaulieu personally to send reinforcements to the Dutch, who were already pressed by the French assault. Beaulieu refused, pleading that his troops had not yet had breakfast, and therefore could not be ready to march before 9 or 10 AM. He also informed the Prince that he had orders to support the British and not the Dutch. However, he detached four squadrons of cavalry (about 400 men) under general Kray to support Prince Frederick at Wervik, who with 5,000 Dutch troops was holding off a French attack of the division-Hédouville that had started at 5 AM. The village had changed hands twice already, before the French managed to occupy it in force, and drove the Dutch back with sustained artillery fire.

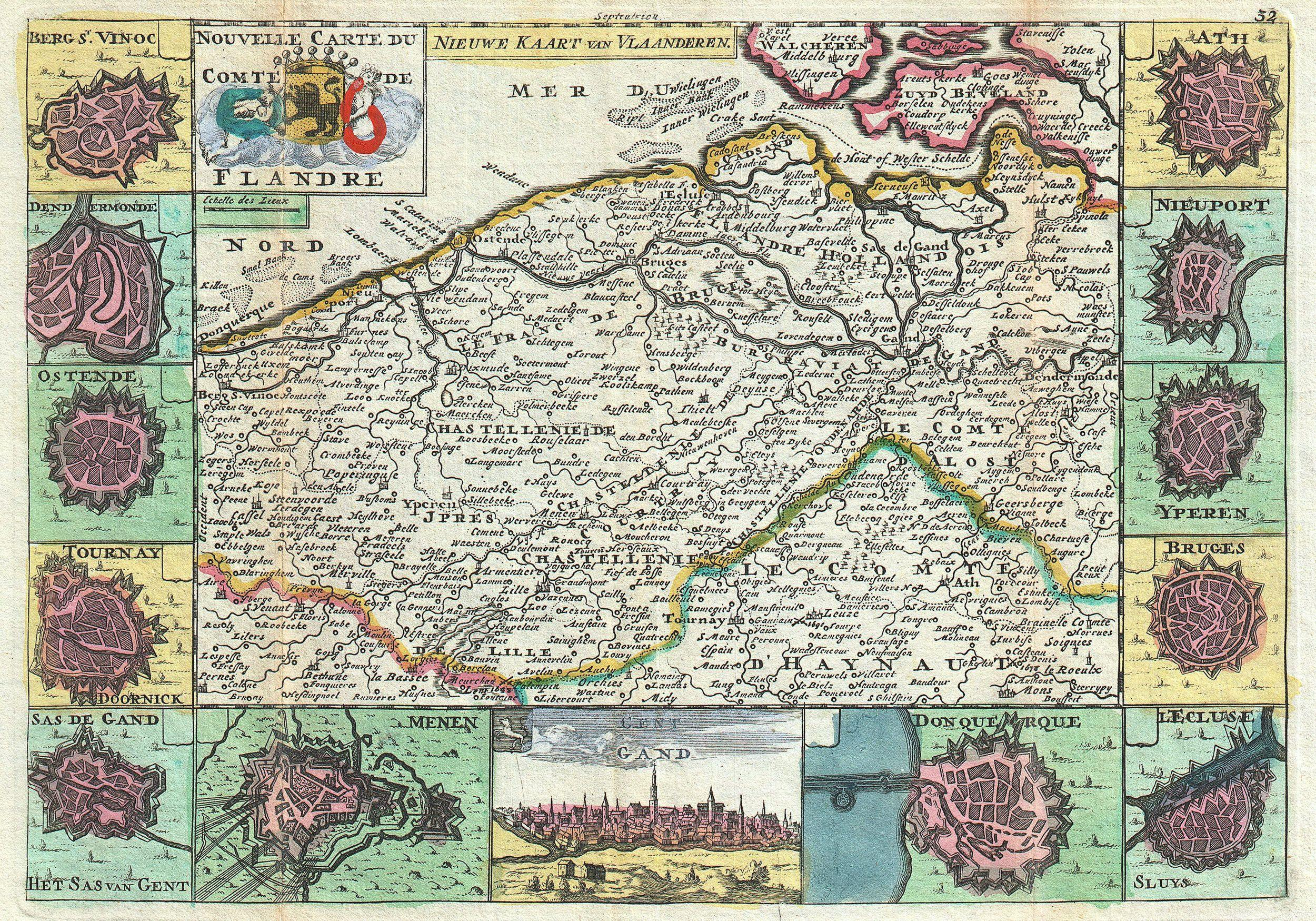
Map by Daniel de la Feuille of Flanders – the battlefield is in the middle of the triangle "Ipres"-Tournai-Courtrai (click for higher resolution and zoom)

When general Kray arrived at Wervik, he assured Prince Frederick that Beaulieu's main force would follow, and convinced the inexperienced Dutchman that it was safe to start a counterattack. The young Prince set himself at the head of the Dutch Guards, and supported by the Swiss regiment-De Gumoëns (in Dutch service) and two grenadier battalions, flanked by Dutch and Austrian cavalry, attacked a French battery head on. The Austrian cavalry troops were hit by heavy grapeshot, and in confusion rode down the Dutch infantry, which also broke. At this crucial moment Prince Frederick was hit in the shoulder by a musket ball, and fell through loss of blood unconscious off his horse. Only with difficulty was he evacuated to a Dutch field ambulance. This loss of the Dutch commander prompted so much confusion on the Allied side that a general retreat started, led by Frederick's second-in-command major-general Count Golowkin. The retreat was bravely covered by the Swiss, who held off pursuing French cavalry, but in the rearguard action the battalion of major Hohenlohe was destroyed with great loss of life.

Meanwhile, the Hereditary Prince led the Dutch defense at Halluin with six battalions, under command of Count Wartensleben, against two strong French columns of the division-Béru, that vastly outnumbered the Dutch, and had 17 heavy artillery pieces, which did great execution among the Dutch. The Dutch troops fought on in the vain hope that Beaulieu would send reinforcements. Around 11 AM the Dutch had to give way, as a third French column threatened to turn their flank. French troops under general Dumonceau managed to reach the fortified, but lightly defended, town of Menen, thereby splitting the Dutch forces. When he heard this, general Golowkin, who had intended to occupy the town, decided to retreat further in the direction of Roeselare. This forced the Hereditary Prince, still near Menen, to give up his defence also, and to retreat in the direction of Kortrijk (Courtrai). In the evening he made a stand in a good position near Wevelgem. Dutch cavalry, and a Prussian corps under Von Reitzenstein that had observed the battle with interest near Gheluvelt, but not engaged in it, managed to break through the French lines and retreat to the vicinity of Ypres.

The next day the Hereditary Prince started the Dutch troops on an orderly strategic retreat (and therefore not in disarray, as some sources claim without any basis) toward Ghent. On the way he met Beaulieu, who had the temerity to ask for some Dutch troops to cover Kortrijk. The Prince refused in a huff. According to De Bas the Hereditary Prince was much appreciated by the Dutch authorities (especially his father, the stadtholder and Captain-General of the States Army) for his decision to extricate the Dutch troops from Wervik and Menen, and retreat all the way to Ghent, thereby avoiding the destruction of the mobile army. If only he had done so sooner, as he intended on 10 September, instead of accepting battle against overwhelming odds. But then he reasonably assumed that Beaulieu's main force would join him in the battle. If this had happened the two forces would have been more evenly matched in numbers.

The Dutch losses were 97 officers and 1394 non-commissioned officers and men (of which 18 officers and 131 other ranks killed), 164 horses and 40 guns. The French had 600 casualties. Historian Ramsay Weston Phipps gave Dutch losses as 88 officers and 3,000 rank and file, including 1,200 men and 40 guns captured. Digby Smith stated Dutch losses as 3,100 men and 40 guns out of a total of 13,000 infantry and 1,800 cavalry, while the French lost 1,500 men.

== Aftermath ==
Ironically, after the battle the city of Menen was occupied by troops of the Légion franche étrangère (Batavian Legion), a brigade formed by exiled Dutch Patriots and commanded by lieutenant-colonel Daendels.

Three days later Houchard met Beaulieu and was defeated by the well-rested Austrians at the Battle of Courtrai (1793), and the Dutch revolutionaries were chased out of Menen again, but they returned in October with the division Souham, where they distinguished themselves at the recapture of the city on the 25th.

The Dutch States Army remained at Ghent for the remainder of 1793. Prince Frederick had a difficult recovery from his wound; it never healed satisfactorily and may have contributed to his premature death in 1799.

The British and Hanoverians reoccupied the Leie-line in late September, but were again driven from Wervik and Menen by Dumesny and Jacques MacDonald in October. However, the 1793 Campaign season was ended by the battles of Cysoing and Marchiennes, and the French had to retreat from these positions.
