= Siege of Le Quesnoy (1793) =

Siege of the War of the First Coalition

Coordinates: 50°14′59″N 3°38′18″E

- Part of War of the First Coalition
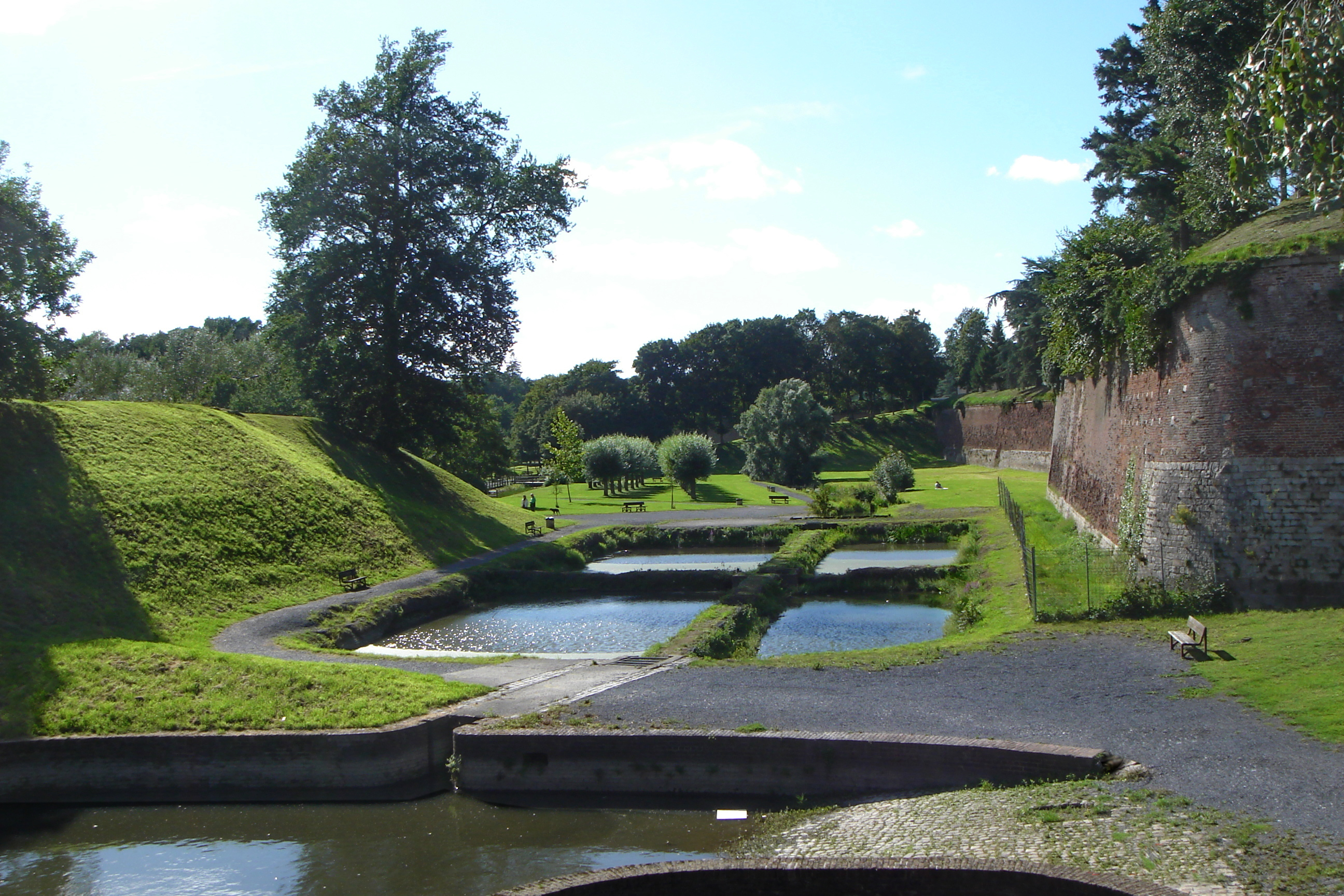
- The defenses of Le Quesnoy are preserved in a park.
Date	28 August – 13 September 1793
Location	Le Quesnoy, France
Result	Coalition victory

Belligerents
(Habsburg monarchy) Habsburg Austria (Kingdom of France) French Royalists	Republican France

Commanders and leaders
(Habsburg monarchy) Count of Clerfayt	(France) François Goullus

Strength
18,000	5,000

Casualties and losses
208	5,000

The siege of Le Quesnoy (28 August – 13 September 1793) saw a force made up of Habsburg Austrians and French Royalists led by François Sébastien Charles Joseph de Croix, Count of Clerfayt lay siege to a Republican French garrison commanded by François Goullus. After two and a half week siege, the French capitulated after suffering heavy losses. The War of the First Coalition operation was fought at Le Quesnoy, located near the border with Belgium about 27 kilometres (17 mi) west of Maubeuge.

After the successful sieges of Condé and Valenciennes, the Coalition divided their forces. While an Austrian army laid siege to Le Quesnoy, a British-led army marched west to the coast to operate against Dunkirk. On 11 September, two French columns marched to the relief of Le Quesnoy. The force from Cambrai on the west came to grief in the Battle of Avesnes-le-Sec while the force from Maubeuge was also repelled. The Le Quesnoy garrison laid down their arms on 13 September, but the siege of Dunkirk was a total failure. Undeterred, the Austrian host next laid siege to Maubeuge, leading to the Battle of Wattignies in mid-October.

== Siege ==
The Coalition besieging force under the Count of Clerfayt numbered about 18,000 troops in 24 battalions and 10 squadrons. There were five Austrian grenadier battalions, those of Attems, Sinoth, Ulm, Ulrich and Watsch. The Austrian line infantry included two battalions each of Infantry Regiments Archduke Charles Nr. 3, Deutschmeister Nr. 4, Klebek Nr. 14, Hohenlohe Nr. 17, Grand Duke of Tuscany Nr. 23, Wartensleben Nr. 28, Michael Wallis Nr. 29, Erbach Nr. 42 and Stain Nr. 50, and one battalion of Infantry Regiment Beaulieu Nr. 59. The Austrian cavalry comprised four squadrons of the Latour Chevau-léger Regiment Nr. 31 and two squadrons of the Barco Hussar Regiment Nr. 35. The French Royalist cavalry included two squadrons each of the Bérchény and Saxe Hussars.

== Results ==
The Coalition admitted losses of 208 killed and wounded during the siege. The French lost about 1,000 killed out of a garrison of 5,000 troops. The 4,000 survivors became prisoners of war.
