= Jean Nicolas Houchard =

French general (1739–1793)

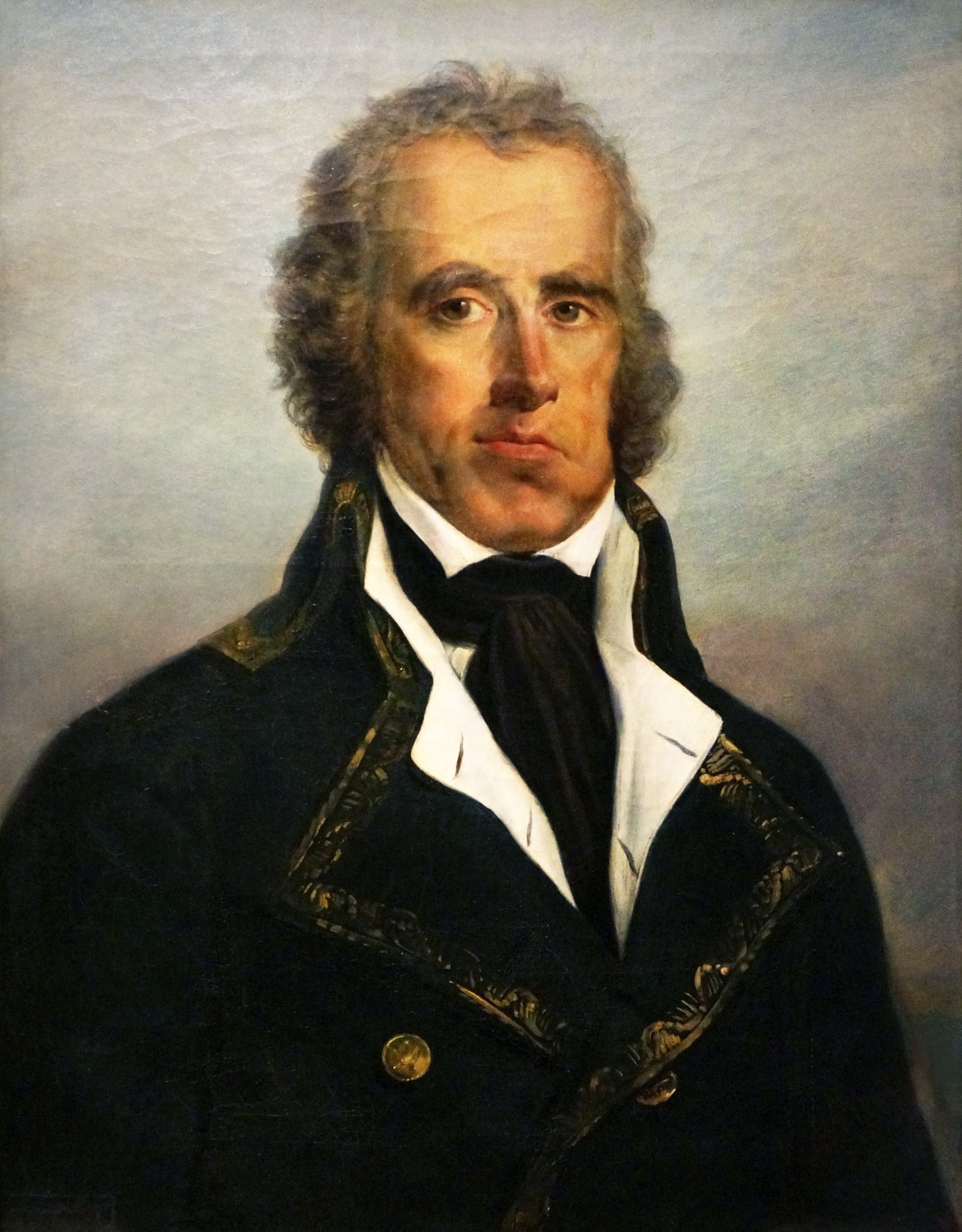
- 1836 portrait of Houchard
- Born: 24 January 1739; Forbach, France
- Died: 17 November 1793 (aged 54); Paris, France
- Military career
- Allegiance: Kingdom of France; French First Republic
- Service years: 1755–1793
- Rank: General-in-chief
- Commands: Army of the Rhine
- Conflicts: French conquest of Corsica: French Revolutionary Wars; • Limburg; • Arlon; • Hondschoote; • Menin
- Awards: Name inscribed on the Arc de Triomphe

Jean Nicolas Houchard (English: /uːˈʃɑːr/ oo-SHAR, French: [ʒɑ̃ nikɔla uʃaʁ]; 24 January 1739 – 17 November 1793) was a French Army officer who served in the French Revolutionary Wars.

== Early life ==
Jean Nicolas Houchard was born on 24 January 1739 in Forbach, Lorraine. Houchard began his military career at the age of sixteen when he joined the French Royal Army's Royal German Cavalry Regiment. He became a captain in the Bourbon Dragoon Regiment and took part in the French conquest of Corsica, where Houchard was wounded while fighting against Corsican forces under Pasquale Paoli at the Battle of Ponte Novu, receiving a deep sabre cut across his cheek and a gunshot wound to his mouth which left him disfigured for the rest of his life.

Houchard was a fervent supporter of the French Revolution. Phipps describes Houchard as "Brave & stupid... Tall, brave, a proved 'patriot'". In 1792, he was colonel of a regiment of Chasseurs-à-cheval in the army of General Custine. On 11 April 1793 Houchard was appointed as Commander-in-Chief of the Army of the Moselle and when Custine was guillotined, Houchard replaced him in August as Commander-in-Chief of the Army of the North.

== Assessment ==
Custine prophesied that the command of an army would be "an evil present" to him. Houchard himself was fully aware that it could be a fatal command, and his confidence was thus shaken "is there any more cruel position than this?" he wrote At the head of the army he became dejected, and let the Representatives have a free hand, over-riding his bold plan. At Hondschoote he failed to exert control over any except Jourdan's column, and spread his forces twice when concentration on Walmoden's left would have given decisive victory. He was "In his element" leading the charge of a cavalry regiment. After Hondschoote he failed to organise an effective pursuit, "cowed" by the minor check at Rexpoede. Then he was denounced as incapable, not without reason. "The army, which knew his faults, knew also his gallantry and his patriotism...". In December 1792 Custine "had not enough knowledge of war and he owed much to the advice of his lieutenant, Houchard, who was a bold and capable head of an advanced guard". His appointment to command the 'Moselle' was "probably done to please Custine; he, however, considered it was a harmful present to Houchard, who, he feared, would fail in the command on an army. Custine certainly could judge men, and he was right in this case, for all who knew the worthy old Houchard considered him as lost when given a charge so much beyond his powers".

Custine stated – "'The conduct of two armies is beyond Houchard’s power, and the conduct of one army would be above his power if he were not guided'. Unfortunately this was published, and Houchard, whilst not asking to be given any command beyond that of the 'Moselle', felt the slur the more that undoubtedly his advice had been of use to the General that now denied his fitness to command at all". "The conviction that 'the soldier is good' permeated so much of the discussion of victory and defeat that it rose to the level of dogma… 'I say to you with the truthfulness of a true republican,… the soldiers are good, but the cowardice and crass ignorance of the officer has taught them cowardice.' This characteristic criticism came from the pen of General Houchard, soon to suffer death for his own failures". "There was nothing aristocratic about Houchard. He rose from the ranks as an officer of fortune, reaching the rank of captain in 1779, after twenty-four years of service. When war broke out in 1792, Captain Houchard climbed the ladder of promotion rapidly and followed Custine as chief of the Nord on 1 August. Unfortunately, Houchard soon revealed himself to be a man of limited capacity… Houchard paid for failure with his life… he went to the scaffold in November not for treachery but for incompetence. By his arrest and execution the Convention made it clear that it demanded ability as well as loyalty from its officers".

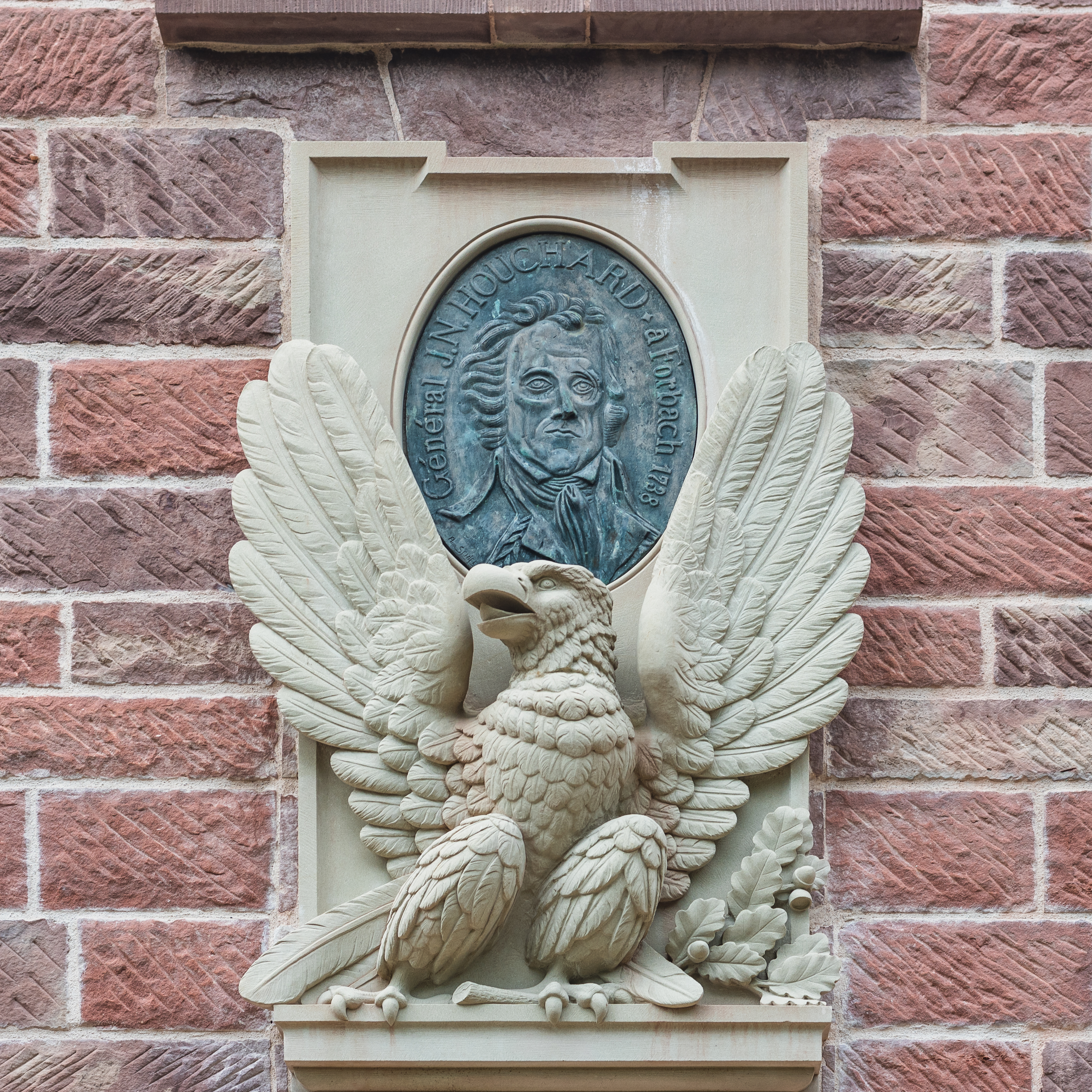
Commemorative plaque to Houchard at the Château du Schlossberg in Forbach

== Trial and execution ==
He was the main commander of the French victories at the Battle of Hondschoote against an Anglo-German army under the Duke of York and at the Battle of Menin against Dutch forces under the Prince of Orange. Despite the French victories, Houchard was censured for failing to pursue the enemy and he was arrested at Lille on 24 September 1793. When accused of cowardice by the Revolutionary Tribunal, Houchard replied "Read my answer!", while tearing his shirt off and showing his many battle wounds. Houchard returned to his seat and kept repeating to himself: "The bastard! He called me coward... he called me coward!". However, the tribunal found him guilty, and Houchard was guillotined in Paris on 17 November 1793 (26 Brumaire, Year II).
