= Antoine Balland =

French general (1751–1821)

- Born: 27 August 1751; Pont-de-Beauvoisin, France
- Died: 3 November 1821 (aged 70) Guise, Aisne, France
- Allegiance: France
- Branch: Infantry
- Service years: 1769–1798
- Rank: General of Division
- Conflicts: War of the First Coalition; Battle of Jemappes; Battle of Wattignies; Battle of Le Cateau; Battle of Beaumont; Siege of Landrecies
- Awards: Légion d'Honneur, 1805
- Other work: Mayor of Guise, 1817

Antoine Balland (27 August 1751 – 3 November 1821) commanded a French infantry division during the early years of the French Revolutionary Wars. A former private, he was promoted to command an infantry regiment after the Battle of Jemappes. He became a general of brigade in late August 1793 and a general of division less than three weeks later. Soon afterwards, he led a division in Jean-Baptiste Jourdan's victory at Wattignies. In the spring of 1794, he led his troops at Le Cateau, Beaumont and Landrecies. By this time it was obvious that he did not have the talent to command a combat division and he was replaced by Jean Baptiste Kléber. He was employed in Italy until 1798 and died at Guise in 1821.

== Early career ==
Balland was born at Pont-de-Beauvoisin on 27 August 1751. He enlisted in the Beauvoisis Regiment on 17 April 1769, which later became the 57th Line Infantry Regiment. He was promoted corporal on 17 February 1771, sergeant on 24 February 1773, sergeant major on 11 August 1781 and adjutant on 4 September 1784. He was discharged from the Beauvoisis Regiment on 1 November 1790.

== French Revolution ==
=== Jemappes and Wattignies ===
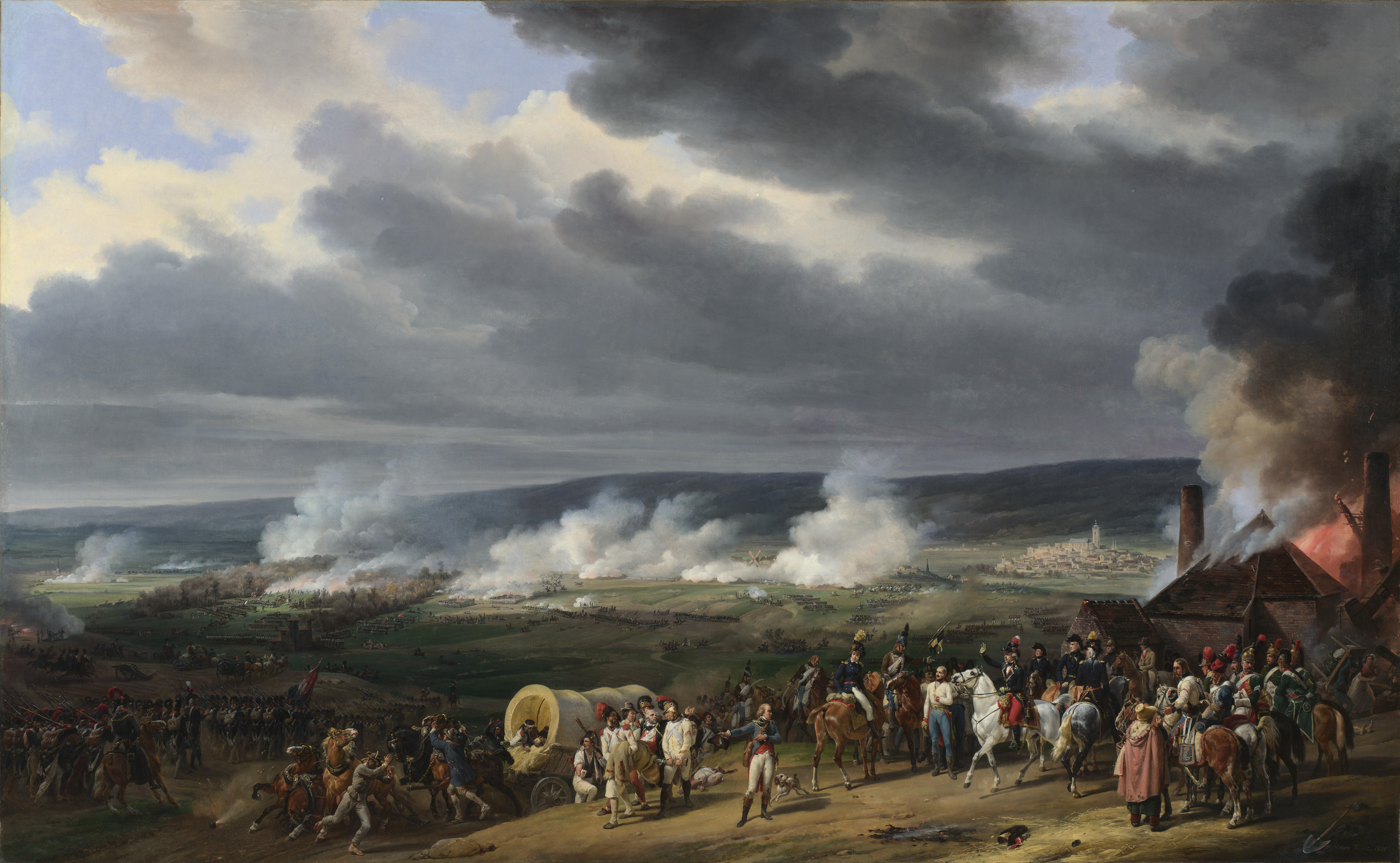
The Battle of Jemappes by Horace Vernet. Balland fought at the battle.

Balland joined the 1st National Guard Battalion of Paris as a captain on 21 July 1791. He became the second lieutenant colonel on 16 January 1792 and first lieutenant colonel on 27 August 1792. At the Battle of Jemappes on 6 November 1792, the Right Wing Advance Guard under Auguste Marie Henri Picot de Dampierre included the 1st Paris Battalion. Balland fought at Jemappes and earned promotion to colonel of the 83rd Infantry Regiment on 8 March 1793. He assumed the rank of general of brigade on 27 August 1793 and general of division seventeen days later on 13 September 1793.

The writer Paul Thiébault was enraged that Balland, a man "without form and without foundation", was named to command a division. Balland took Édouard Mortier on his staff. After the Coalition army began the Siege of Maubeuge, Army of the North commander Jean-Baptiste Jourdan began shifting his main army from the Camp of Gavrelle south-east to Guise. He sent the first division under Jacques Fromentin on 3 October and the second division under Balland at dawn on 6 October. Balland's 13,424-man division reached Bapaume that evening, Péronne on 7 October, Saint-Quentin on 8 October and Guise the next day. Jourdan massed a total of 44,276 soldiers at Guise.

Jourdan attacked the Coalition army of Prince Josias of Saxe-Coburg-Saalfeld in the Battle of Wattignies from 15–16 October 1793. Balland's division consisted of 11,884 infantry in eight battalions of regulars and 13 of volunteers (21 battalions), ranging in strength from 218 to 895 men. The 1,410 mounted troops included the 16th and 17th Heavy Cavalry and the 4th Hussar and 6th Chasseurs à Cheval Regiments. On the first day, the French planned to have the left and right wings attack first. After progress was made on the flanks, Balland's division in the center would attack.

Initially Fromentin's soldiers on the left flank and Florent Joseph Duquesnoy's troops on the right gained ground. Though Jourdan believed it was not yet time, the powerful politician Lazare Carnot of the Committee of Public Safety insisted that Balland's men immediately assault the village of Dourlers. The attack was launched and was beaten back with losses of about 1,500 men. At the same time Fromentin was repulsed and Duquesnoy was stopped at Wattignies, with a loss of 12 guns. During the night, Jourdan took 6,000 troops from Balland to help Duquesnoy's men capture Wattignies and Coburg assembled 16,400 foot and 6,000 horse to oppose the French. On 16 October, the French moved into position in a fog but their first two attacks were defeated; the third assault succeeded and the battle was won.

=== Le Cateau and Landrecies ===
The new Army of the North commander Jean-Charles Pichegru, ordered an attack on Le Cateau-Cambrésis on 29 March 1794. The divisions of Balland and Jacques Gilles Henri Goguet advanced from Guise, while Fromentin moved from Avesnes-sur-Helpe. In the Battle of Le Cateau, the French were beaten with the loss of 1,200 casualties and four guns, while the Austrians only lost 293 men. On 17 and 18 April, Coburg's army drove back Balland, Goguet and Fromentin to open the Siege of Landrecies. In the operation, the 60,000-man Coalition army sustained 1,000 casualties including 627 Austrians, while the French lost over 2,000 killed, wounded and missing as well as 24 field guns. Since Pichegru was far away at Lille, Balland as the senior general on the spot ordered a counter-stroke. The attack on 21 April was repulsed with the loss of 500 killed and four guns. One of the dead was Goguet, shot down by mutinous group of his own men.

On 26 April, the French divisions launched simultaneous attacks on the Coalition positions in the Battle of Beaumont. Coalition cavalry rode down the division of René-Bernard Chapuy, capturing thousands of French soldiers and their commanding general. Balland's division was routed in a separate action on 26 April. Landrecies fell to the Coalition on 30 April. New commanders were being promoted to division command; Paul-Alexis Dubois replaced Goguet and Jacques Philippe Bonnaud replaced Chapuy. By this time there were protests that Balland's troops fought poorly and that he did not support his fellow commanders. Fromentin wrote that, "everyone complains about him". On 11 May, Balland was removed from command of his division and replaced by Jean Baptiste Kléber.

== Later career ==
Balland was not in the list of active generals on 13 June 1795 and was discharged on 13 March 1798. He was employed in Italy when the widespread revolt against the French known as the Veronese Easter broke out on 17 April 1797. The insurgents massacred all French soldiers they could find, but the French rear-area commanders competently moved against the revolt. Balland was commander of the Verona forts and he fired on the city. Though an Austrian force under Johann Ludwig Alexius von Loudon hovered nearby, it failed to intervene before the Peace of Leoben between France and Austria was signed. French troops under Charles Edward Jennings de Kilmaine and Charles-Pierre Augereau crushed the rebellion. As a penalty, Verona was required to pay a large amount of money. Kilmaine, Augereau, and Balland each helped themselves to sums of 200,000 livres, and when Napoleon Bonaparte heard of this, he demanded that the generals disgorge their plunder, though Kilmaine apparently refused to do so.

Balland was awarded the Légion d'Honneur in 1805. One source stated that he received the knight's cross of the Légion d'Honneur (again) on 28 August 1817. That year he became mayor of Guise and was granted a patent of nobility as a chevalier on 28 March 1818. He died at Guise on 3 November 1821.
