= Pierre Raphaël Paillot de Beauregard =

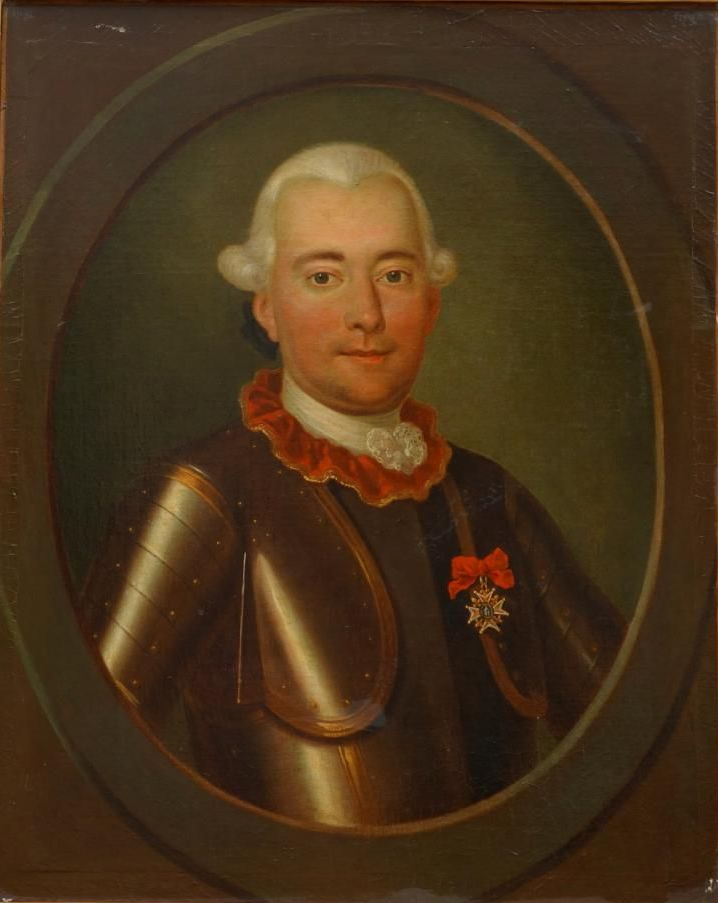
- Born: 14 February 1734; Saint-Palais-sur-Mer, France
- Died: 30 September 1799 (aged 65) Saintes, Charente-Maritime, France
- Allegiance: Kingdom of France; France
- Branch: Cavalry, Infantry
- Service years: (Kingdom of France) 1755–1792 (France) 1792–1796
- Rank: General of Division
- Conflicts: Seven Years' War; War of the First Coalition; Battle of Arlon; Battle of Wattignies; War in the Vendée
- Awards: Order of Saint-Louis, 1779

Pierre Raphaël Paillot de Beauregard (14 February 1734 – 30 September 1799) led a French division at the Battle of Wattignies. A nobleman, he joined the French Royal Army as a cadet in 1755 and fought in the Seven Years' War. He became a lieutenant colonel in 1779, but two years later got into a dispute with a superior officer and was placed on inactive service. The French Revolution and the War of the First Coalition saved his career; he was promoted general of brigade in 1792. He led a 2,000-man column at Arlon in 1793 but irritated his army commander. After his 5,800-strong division performed poorly at Wattignies he was put in prison for 10 months. He was briefly employed again during the War in the Vendée in 1795 before retiring from military service in 1796.

== Early career ==
Beauregard was born on 14 February 1734 at Saint-Palais-sur-Mer, France. He entered the Noailles Cavalry Regiment in 1755 as a cadet and served in the Seven Years' War. He transferred to the Clermont Volunteers in 1758 as a lieutenant of dragoons and was discharged in 1760. He became a captain of infantry in 1766, transferred to the dragoons on 29 February 1768 and transferred again to the Penthièvre Dragoon Regiment on 9 December 1776. He was promoted to lieutenant colonel and awarded the Order of Saint-Louis on 8 April 1779. He was incarcerated for three months in the Château de Ham starting on 7 October 1781 for disrespect toward his commanding officer, a brigadier general. When he emerged from prison on 28 December 1781 he was placed on retirement.

== French Revolutionary Wars ==
=== Chalons and Arlon ===
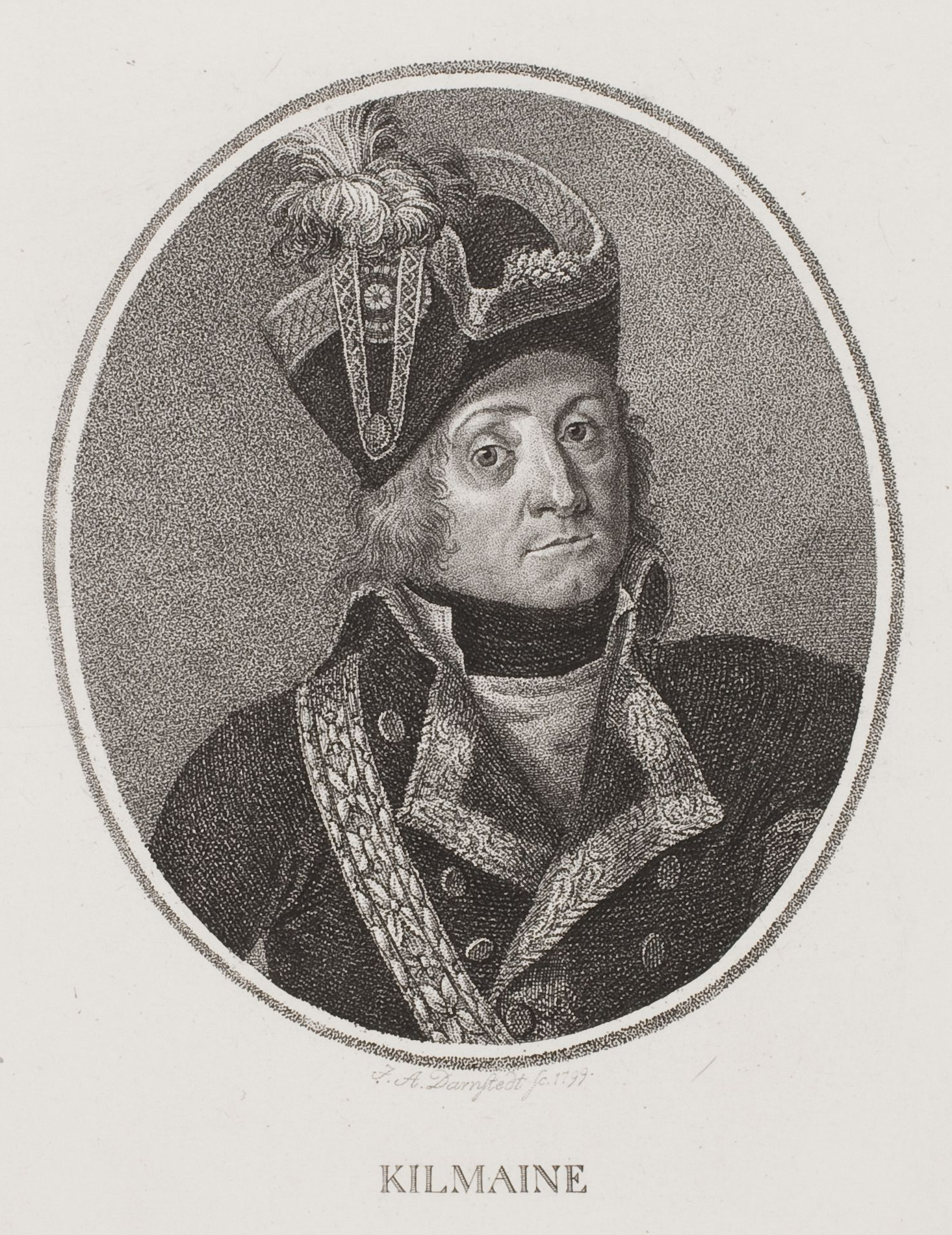
Charles Kilmaine was deeply irritated with Beauregard.

On 1 March 1792 Beauregard was promoted to general of brigade. After an assignment at Avignon he was given command of the 2nd Military Division at Châlons-sur-Marne on 1 October 1792. One source described the troops at Châlons as an "unruly mob". Except for one battalion of regulars, the force was composed entirely of volunteers. Its commander was Alexandre Séraphin Joseph Magnus de Sparre who was unable to instill any discipline in this body of soldiers. On 28 February 1793, Beauregard replaced Sparre in command at Châlons. On 8 April he was sent to command troops at Sedan. He was elevated in rank to general of division in the Army of the Ardennes on 15 May 1793.

In June 1793, Charles Edward Jennings de Kilmaine commanded the Army of the Ardennes which only numbered about 8,500 men at Sedan. Kilmaine proposed moving north from Givet against Liège while Beauregard moved east toward Arlon. In cooperation, the Army of the Moselle would advance on Arlon and capture its Coalition supply magazine. Jean Nicolas Houchard, the commander of the Army of the Moselle agreed to send Amable Henri Delaage with 10,500 men, but the force was only to hold the town for two days before withdrawing. Adam Philippe de Custine cancelled Kilmaine's main offensive but allowed Beauregard to proceed with 2,000 soldiers. On 7 June Delaage's advanced guard appeared before Arlon but was repulsed. On the 8th Beauregard's column showed up and Delaage determined to try again. The French attacked on 9 June and defeated an Austrian division under Gottfried von Schroder. The Austrian force numbered 6,000 men in seven infantry battalions and eight cavalry squadrons. They sustained 600 casualties and lost five guns and four ammunition wagons. The French counted 900 killed and wounded out of 8,500 foot soldiers and 1,000 horsemen.

On 10 October, an exasperated Kilmaine wrote to a friend, "Try in the name of heaven to rid me of this old general Beauregard, he is a true agent of the old regime, a dirty schemer who puts the entire division in confusion. I cannot do the Republic any good serving with him".

=== Wattignies ===
On 30 September 1793, the 60,000-strong Coalition army under Prince Josias of Saxe-Coburg-Saalfeld began the Siege of Maubeuge. On 22 September, Jean-Baptiste Jourdan was appointed commander of the Army of the North. In the emergency, Jourdan began assembling a relief army at Guise. Beauregard took command of a 4,263-man Army of the Ardennes division cobbled together from units at Sedan, Montmédy and the Camp of Carignan. To these were added three volunteer battalions and the 5th Dragoon Regiment from the Army of the North. Aside from the above-named units and the 11th Chasseurs à Cheval, the division was composed of 22 separate detachments, most numbering only 100 or 200 soldiers. Altogether, there were 5,016 infantry and 837 cavalry.

At 7:00 am on 15 October, Beauregard's division left Solre-le-Château to advance on the enemy positions. It was opposed by Karl Joseph Hadik von Futak with two battalions and four squadrons, a total of 2,100 soldiers defending Obrechies. Beauregard's column passed Solrinnes at 10:00 am and soon was attacked by units from the Coburg Dragoons Nr. 37 and Blankenstein Hussars Nr. 16. The badly organised French division was driven back after losing three guns and two caissons. On 16 October the division advanced again, forming the extreme right flank of Jourdan's army. On this day, in addition to the two infantry battalions, Hadik was reinforced to four squadrons each of the Coburg and Blankenstein Regiments. At 8:00 am Beauregard began attacking Obrechies and Hadik was reinforced by an additional battalion. After several hours of fighting, Hadik posted four squadrons to the northwest and two to the northeast, both supported by infantry. As the French began breaking into Obrechies, Hadik ordered a counterattack from the village's defenders and the other two detachments. The three-pronged attack routed Beauregard's troops; they fled back to Solrinnes after abandoning five cannons and three caissons. According to one account, the soldiers did not stop running until they reached Solre-le-Château, putting the day's French successes at risk.

Despite the French victory in the Battle of Wattignies Beauregard was removed from command the next day and imprisoned on 20 October 1793. Released from confinement on 29 August 1794, he was retired from active duty on 15 November that year. On 30 April 1795 he was assigned to the Army of the West to fight in the War in the Vendée. He retired again on 1 January 1796. He was famous for his battle cry, "Heads high boys, the bullets are not shit". He died at Saintes on 30 September 1799.
