= Battle of Wattignies =

1793 battle during the War of the First Coalition

- Part of the Flanders campaign in the War of the First Coalition
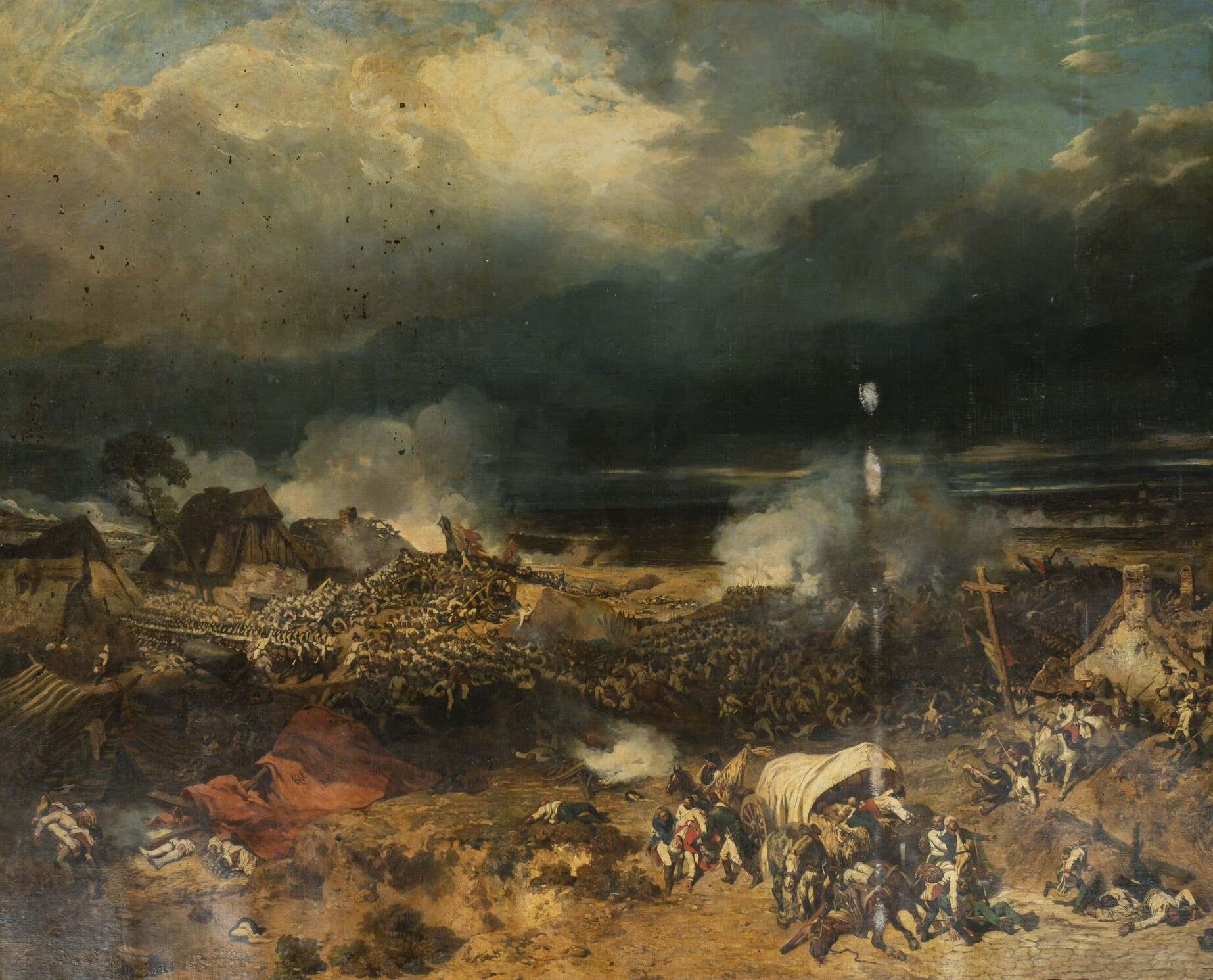
- Battle of Wattignies by Eugène Lami
Date	15–16 October 1793
Location	Wattignies-la-Victoire, near Maubeuge, France 50°12′05″N 04°00′48″E
Result	French victory

Belligerents
France	(Habsburg monarchy) Austria; Dutch Republic

Commanders and leaders
(France) Jean-Baptiste Jourdan (France) Lazare Carnot (France) Jacques Ferrand	(Holy Roman Empire) Prince Josias of Saxe-Coburg-Saalfeld (Holy Roman Empire) Count of Clerfayt (Dutch Republic) Prince of Orange

Strength
Engaged: 45,000; Jourdan: 45,000; Ferrand: 25,000	Engaged: 22,400; Army of Observation: 37,000; Siege: 26,000

Casualties and losses
3,000–5,000	3,000
- Location within France Battle of Wattignies (Europe)

The Battle of Wattignies (15–16 October 1793) saw a French army commanded by Jean-Baptiste Jourdan attack a Coalition army directed by Prince Josias of Saxe-Coburg-Saalfeld. After two days of combat Jourdan's troops compelled the Habsburg covering force led by François Sébastien Charles Joseph de Croix, Count of Clerfayt to withdraw. The War of the First Coalition victory allowed the French to raise the siege of Maubeuge. At a time when failed generals were often executed or imprisoned, Jourdan had to endure interference from Lazare Carnot from the Committee of Public Safety. The village, renamed Wattignies-la-Victoire in honor of the important success, is located 9 kilometres (6 mi) southeast of Maubeuge.

Coburg's main army encircled 25,000 French soldiers in Maubeuge while about 22,000 Austrians under Clerfayt were formed in a semi-circle, covering the southern approaches to the fortress. On the first day, 45,000 French soldiers mounted a clumsy attack which was easily repulsed, except near the village of Wattignies. On the second day, Jourdan concentrated half his army at Wattignies and after a tough fight, forced Coburg to concede defeat. Though the Coalition army was better trained than the French, its units were spread out too thinly and the different nationalities failed to cooperate. Soon the Coalition army went into winter quarters, finishing a campaign that started with great promise and ended in disappointment. Carnot rewrote history so that he and the political representatives got most of the credit for the triumph; Jourdan was dismissed in January 1794.

== Background ==
In the summer of 1793, the 118,000-strong Coalition army punched a gap in the line of French fortresses along the frontier with the Austrian Netherlands, with the siege of Condé concluding on 12 July and the siege of Valenciennes on 27 July. In the Battle of Caesar's Camp, the Coalition army under Prince Josias of Saxe-Coburg-Saalfeld hustled the French Army of the North out of a position near Cambrai on 7 August. At this moment, the Coalition allies unwisely split their forces. Prince Frederick, Duke of York and Albany headed west toward Dunkirk with 37,000 British, Austrians, Hanoverians and Hessians.

From 6–8 September, the Army of the North under Jean Nicolas Houchard defeated the Dunkirk covering force in the Battle of Hondschoote, compelling the Duke of York to give up the siege of Dunkirk. This was followed by the Battle of Menin on 13 September, in which the French routed a Dutch corps under Prince William of Orange. The Dutch suffered 3,000 casualties and lost 40 field pieces in the disaster. Two days later, an Austrian corps led by Johann Peter Beaulieu routed the French and recaptured Menen (Menin).

Coburg's main army concluded the siege of Le Quesnoy on 13 September, taking 4,000 French troops prisoner. Two French columns attempted to raise the siege but failed, one of the columns being nearly wiped out by Coalition cavalry in the Battle of Avesnes-le-Sec. Though Coburg might have easily seized Cambrai and Bouchain, which had been stripped of their garrisons to form the relief columns, the Coalition commander chose to move against Maubeuge instead. For these defeats, Houchard was arrested on 23 September and incarcerated in a common prison. Denounced as a coward and a traitor by the Revolutionary Tribunal, he was executed by guillotine on 16 November. His predecessor in command of the Army of the North, Adam Philippe, Comte de Custine had been guillotined on 27 August 1793.

Jean-Baptiste Jourdan had been wounded at Hondschoote and was named to lead the Army of the Ardennes on 9 September. He was appointed provisional commander in chief of the Army of the North on 22 September. When Jourdan protested that he lacked the experience to command the 104,000-man army, the representatives on mission notified him that refusal would result in his arrest. The new commander found that he must respond to the Coalition's move against Maubeuge. Coburg's army began the siege of Maubeuge on 30 September.

== Operations ==
=== French deployment ===
On 1 October 1793, Jourdan's large army was distributed across a broad front in four great masses, starting at the North Sea and running southeast. Joseph Souham at Dunkirk commanded 8,852 infantry in 17 battalions and 430 cavalry in one regiment and André Gigaux at Hondschoote had 7,269 infantry in 15 battalions. Near Cassel, Dominique Vandamme led 8,984 foot soldiers in 19 battalions and 325 horsemen in one regiment, while Charles François Filon led 3,705 foot soldiers in nine battalions. At Bailleul there were 4,166 infantry in 10 battalions. The second mass started at Armentières, where there were 9,644 foot in 19 battalions and 1,338 horse in four regiments. At the Camp of Madelaine near Lille, Antoine Anne Lecourt de Berú directed 13,564 infantry in 28 battalions and 817 Chasseurs à Cheval, in three regiments. Pierre Guillaume Gratien at Mons-en-Pévèle led 3,521 infantry in nine battalions.

The third mass was located at the Camp of Gavrelle between Douai and Arras. Commanded by Jourdan, the force included the Flankers of the Right with 6,048 foot in 15 battalions and 1,602 horse in five regiments and the Flankers of the Left with 6,821 infantry in 14 battalions and 1,323 cavalry in three regiments. The Advance Guard consisted of 4,821 foot in eight battalions and 1,901 horse in five regiments; the Center Division was made up of 4,077 infantry in six battalions and 428 cavalry in two regiments, with two battalions of 732 men guarding the wagon train. Jacques Ferrand commanded the fourth mass, which was in the Maubeuge entrenched camp. Second-in-command was Jean Nestor de Chancel. The fortress garrison under Étienne Gudin counted 2,173 soldiers. Pierre Arnould Meyer's right brigade numbered 6,992 men including the 7th and 12th Dragoons, Joseph-Antoine Colomb's center brigade had 6,802 men and Jacques Desjardin's left brigade consisted of 8,140 men including the 1st Hussars; altogether Ferrand commanded 24,107 soldiers.

=== Blockade of Maubeuge ===
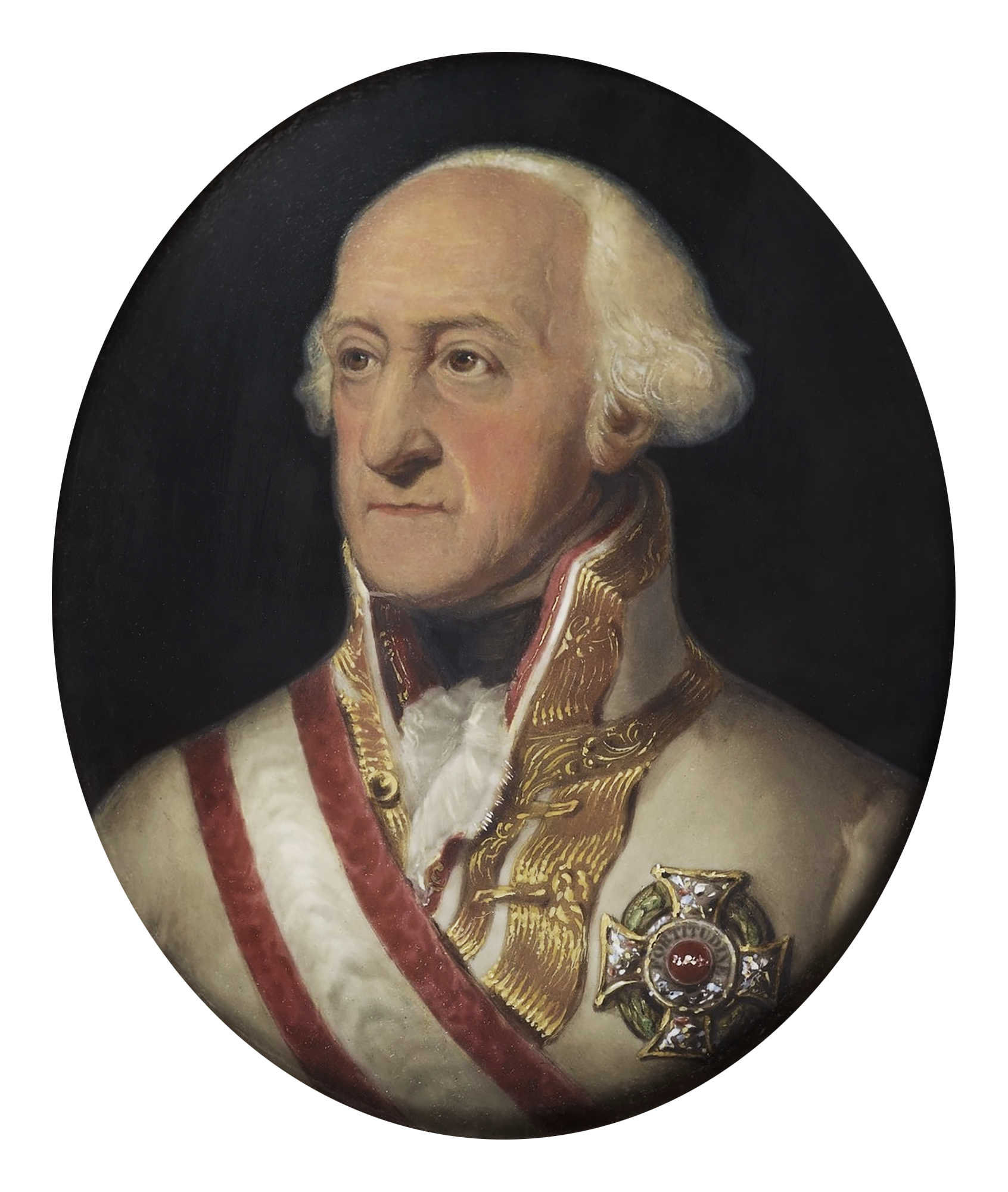
Prince of Coburg

At dawn on 29 September, a column under François Sébastien Charles Joseph de Croix, Count of Clerfayt crossed the Sambre at Berlaimont, southwest of Maubeuge. To the northeast, Franz Vincenz von Hoditz's column crossed the river near Pont-sur-Sambre and a third column led by Wenzel Joseph von Colloredo crossed the Sambre at Hautmont. In a series of skirmishes, the three Austrian columns pressed east, finally driving Desjardin's troops into the Maubeuge entrenched camp, with losses of 150 men and two cannons. To the east of Maubeuge, Austrians under Maximilian Anton Karl, Count Baillet de Latour crossed the Sambre near Marpent and Jeumont. A column under Alexander Friedrich von Seckendorf crossed near Merbes-le-Château farther east. These forces forced Meyer's troops in disorder back within Maubeuge, which was isolated.

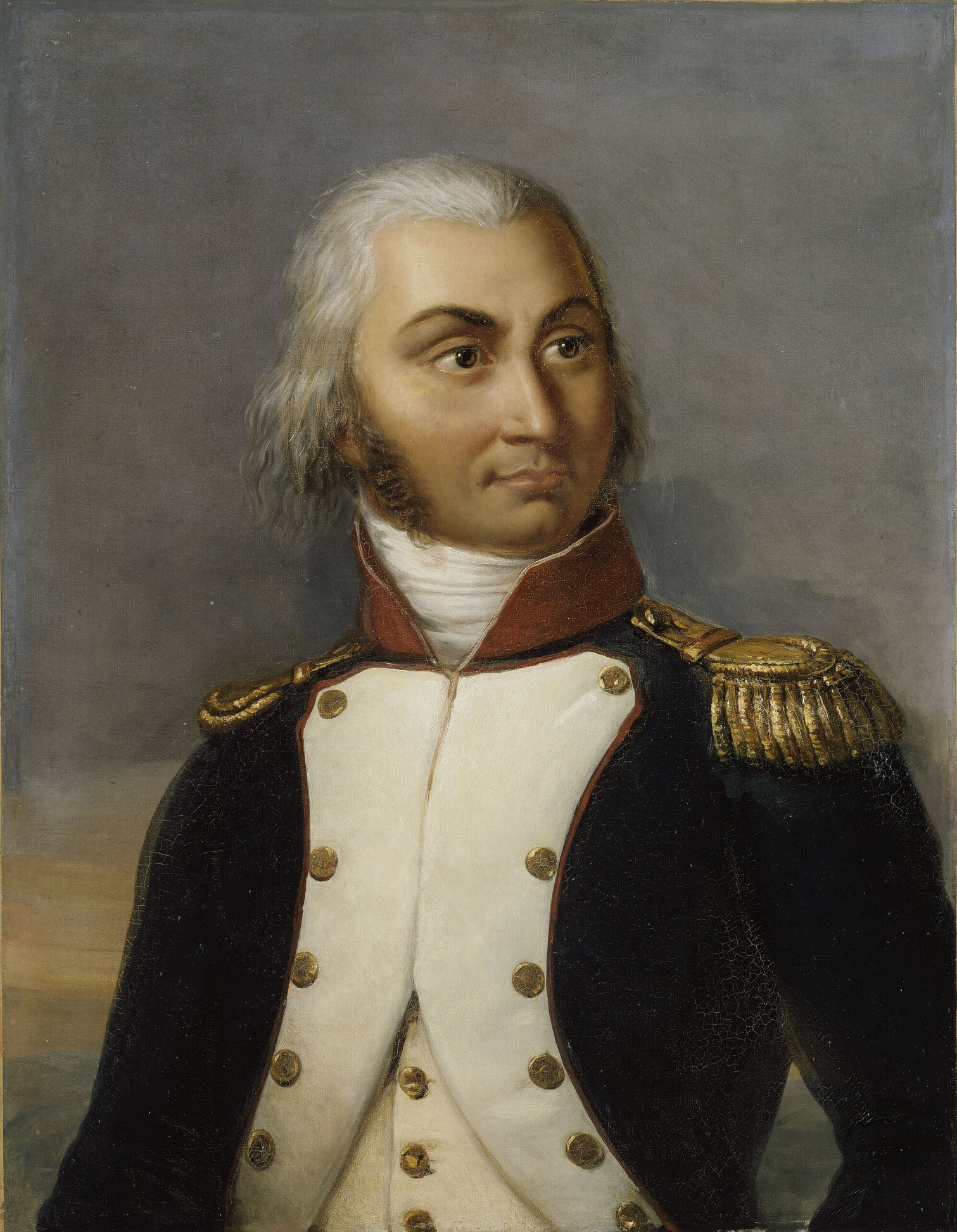
Jean-Baptiste Jourdan

Coburg split his forces into a 26,000-man Siege Army directed by the Prince of Orange and an Army of Observation. The Siege Army consisted of 14,000 Austrians under Colloredo south of the Sambre and 12,000 Dutch under Orange north of the river. Colloredo's force included 16 battalions, 10 companies and eight squadrons. The Army of Observation totaled 25,550 infantry and 12,150 cavalry, distributed in three main divisions. Franz Xaver von Wenckheim commanded 7,250 foot and 4,200 horse, west of the Sambre in the Forêt de Mormal. Hoditz directed 9,300 foot and 3,750 horse on the east of Maubeuge and Clerfayt led 9,000 foot and 4,200 horse on the south side of Maubeuge. Clerfayt divided his corps into three groups under Count Heinrich von Bellegarde, Joseph Binder von Degenschild and Ludwig von Terzi.

The Coalition forces began constructing extensive siege works around Maubeuge. On the first day, the French garrison sortied against the Cense de Château but were repulsed after stiff fighting. Maubeuge was supplied for a normal garrison but far too many soldiers were trapped there. On 10 October, Ferrand had to put the troops on half-rations, while hundreds of sick and dying soldiers crowded the hospitals. On 13 October, the French enjoyed initial success in a sortie against the Bois du Tilleul, but troops sent out to help mistakenly fired on their own friends and the French were compelled to retreat. The Coalition established batteries of 20 24-pound cannons against the town. After the Coalition army opened its bombardment on the night of 14 October, the morale of the garrison sank. When some soldiers complained to Chancel that they were hungry and tired he replied, "Listen young men, it takes a lot of work and privation in order to gain the honor to fight and die for your country." Representative Jean-Baptiste Drouet tried to cut his way out of Maubeuge with some dragoons but was captured. Denounced for abandoning the place, Drouet claimed his escape would have raised the spirits of the garrison.

=== French reaction ===
Leaving 10,000 soldiers in the Camp of Gavrelle to support Bouchain and Cambrai, Jourdan immediately moved to the relief of Maubeuge with the remaining 20,000 men. He also called in 12,000 reinforcements from the Camp de Madelaine and 10,000 more from farther north. Without waiting for the troops from the north, Jourdan assembled a division under Jacques Fromentin. Leaving the camp on 3 October, it arrived at Guise on the 6th. That same day Antoine Balland's division left the Camp of Gavrelle and reached Guise on 9 October. Berú promptly sent Gratien's brigade and other units from Lille and Mons-en-Pévèle, this body of 11,701 soldiers was assigned to Florent Joseph Duquesnoy.

Left wing commander Jean-Baptiste Davaine sent 9,012 troops under Martin Jean Carrion de Loscondes which arrived at Guise on 10 October. The Committee of Public Safety placed the Army of Ardennes under Jourdan's control on 2 October. The army's commander Ferrand was immured in Maubeuge and orders were sent for one detachment to operate from Philippeville. A motley force of 4,263 men was assembled under Pierre Raphaël Paillot de Beauregard and reached Fourmies on 11 October. The next day, several units from the north joined Beauregard's division. Jourdan's army shifted east from Guise to Avesnes-sur-Helpe between 11 and 13 October.

On 14 October, Jourdan and Committee of Public Safety member Lazare Carnot reconnoitered the Coalition front south of Maubeuge. The numerical strength of the army was 37,906 infantry and 6,370 cavalry for a grand total of 44,276, with the troops distributed as follows. Fromentin's division numbered 7,357 men including 1,495 cavalry. Carrion's division, now under Étienne Jean-François Cordellier-Delanoüe, counted 6,866 troops including 668 horsemen. Balland's division consisted of 13,294 soldiers, of which 1,440 were cavalry. Duquesnoy's division had 10,906 men including 1,960 mounted troops. Beauregard's division comprised 5,853 troops of which 837 were horsemen. Historian Ramsay Weston Phipps remarked that Beauregard's men were "bad troops under a bad General".

== Battle ==
=== 15 October ===
The Austrian covering force was entrenched and though Clerfayt was in nominal command, Coburg was on the scene and in control of the battle. Coburg was so certain of success that he was supposed to have said that if he were defeated, he would become a sans-culotte. This story made the rounds in the French army and made its soldiers eager to make the Coalition commander wear trousers.

On the morning of 15 October, Bellegarde held the Coalition right flank with about 5,000 troops in three battalions of foot and 16 squadrons of horse. The extreme right touched the Sambre at Berlaimont. Clerfayt defended the center with 9,200 soldiers, deployed along a west-to-east line of villages. Supported by division commanders were Franz Joseph, Count Kinsky and Joseph Karl von Lilien, Clerfayt controlled five battalions of grenadiers, five battalions of regulars, 1/3 battalion of Croats, four infantry companies and 12 cavalry squadrons. Terzi was posted on the left flank at Wattignies with 4,000 men in three battalions of foot and 12 squadrons of horse. The extreme left at Obrechies was defended by Karl Joseph Hadik von Futak and 2,100 soldiers. Far to the east at Beaumont, Johann Andreas Benjowsky commanded 4,000 troops organized as three battalions and 12 squadrons.

From right to left the French divisions were Beauregard at Solre-le-Château, Duquesnoy on the main road from Avesnes-sur-Helpe, Balland in reserve at Avesnelles, Cordellier at La Capelle and Fromentin at Dompierre-sur-Helpe. Duquesnoy and Beauregard moved to attack Wattignies, while Fromentin advanced against the Austrian right flank. Jourdan enjoyed a two-to-one superiority and the Coalition generals had to be anxious about the 20,000 French soldiers at Maubeuge.

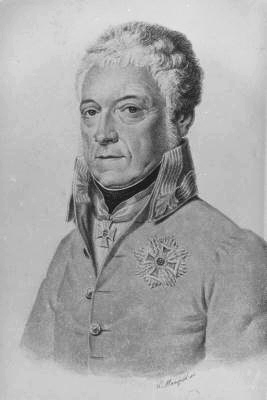
Count Bellegarde

On the right, Beauregard's men left Solre-le-Château at 7:00 am. Near Obrechies, four squadrons of Austrian cavalry charged them and drove them off, with the loss of three field guns. Duquesnoy's division departed Flaumont at 6:00 am and marched through Beugnies, Dimont and Dimechaux. Supported by a plentiful artillery, the French infantry drove two Austrian battalions out of Wattignies, but as the French poured out of the other side of the village they were met by an infantry-cavalry counterattack. Duquesnoy's soldiers abandoned Wattignies and retreated to Dimechaux and Dimont.

On the far left, Cordellier's division advanced on Leval and Monceau-Saint-Waast while farther east, Fromentin's division attacked toward Saint-Remy-Chaussée and Saint-Aubin. Bellegarde's cannons opened fire in mid-morning, starting a mutual bombardment. The French infantry crossed a ravine and grappled for possession of Saint-Aubin village with a Croatian infantry battalion. In the afternoon Bellegarde launched a counterattack led by Austrian regular infantry, while two regiments of cavalry swept down on the French left flank. The Austrians captured eight French cannon and caused the French to flee to the safety of the ravine.

In the center, Clerfayt deployed five grenadier battalions in the villages of Dourlers, Mont-Dourlers, Floursies and along the Monceau Road. This east–west sunken road was located on a reverse slope, just south of Dourlers. The French Royalists and some Croatians guarded the forest to the east, while the Croatian battalion fought to the west at Saint-Aubin. The remaining battalions of Austrian regular foot and all the horse occupied a ridge behind the line of villages.

Jourdan, Carnot and Representative Ernest Dominique François Joseph Duquesnoy accompanied Balland's division in the center. The army commander planned to wait for the attacks of his two wings to make significant progress before launching the attack of Balland's division. In mid-morning, the division filed out of the woods in front of Dourlers and opened fire with its artillery. Seeing the initial success of the two wings, Carnot wanted the attack to be started at once. Jourdan wanted more ground to be gained on the flanks but the politician would not be denied. Finally, Jourdan put himself at the head of Balland's division and ordered the assault. As the French soldiers came over the crest of the ridge in front on the sunken road, they came under murderous fire from the crack Austrian grenadiers. Despite heroic attempts to get light artillery forward, cannons were dismounted and gunners and horses were shot down. In the thick of the bullets, Jourdan bravely urged his troops on but an Austrian force appeared from the direction of Saint-Aubin, threatening the French left flank. At nightfall the representatives authorized a retreat after Balland's division had lost between 1,200 and 1,500 casualties.

=== 16 October ===
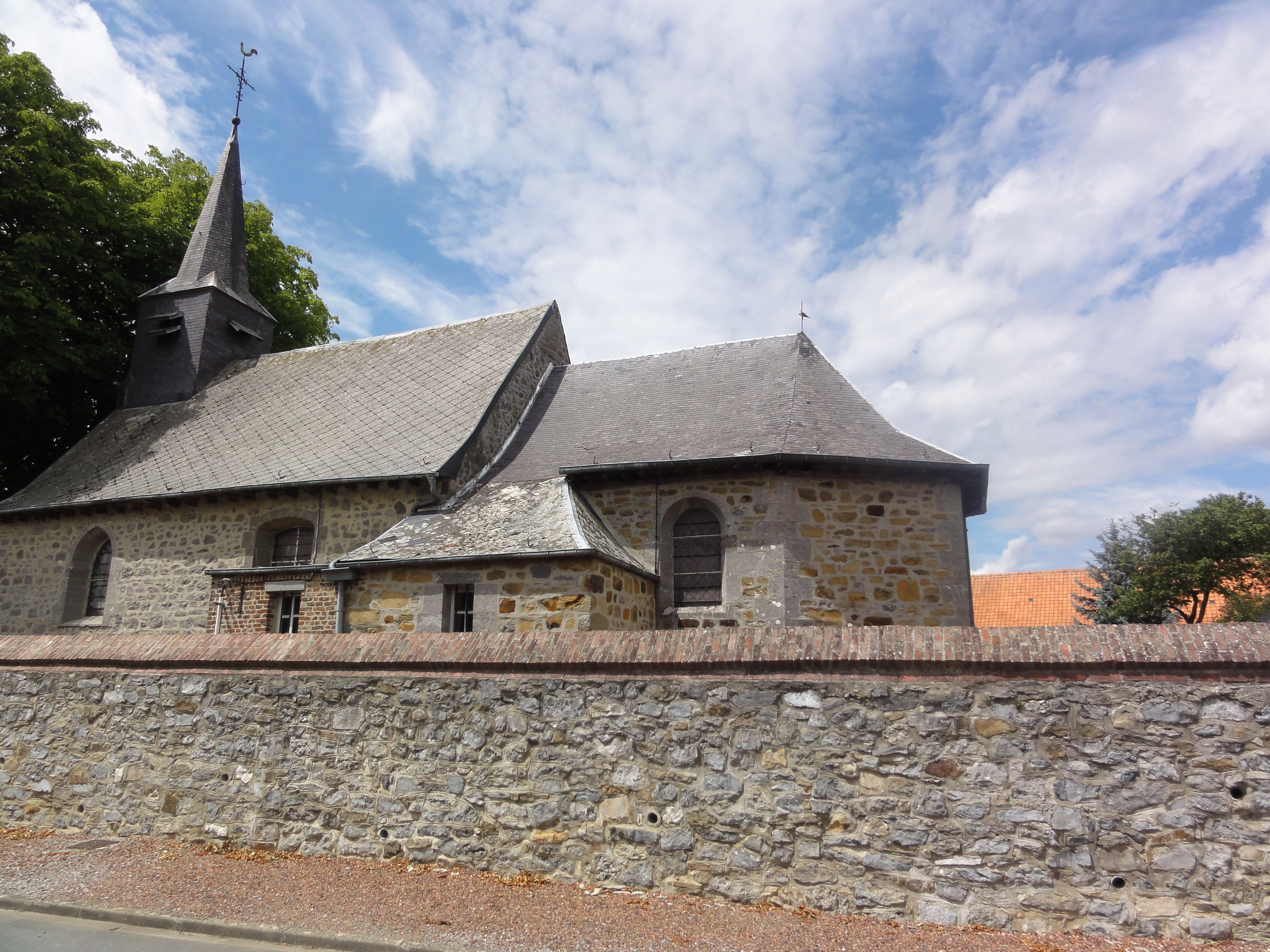
Wattignies church

During the night, French deserters wrongly reported to the Austrians that Jourdan was reinforced to 100,000 men. Believing he was going to be attacked again, Coburg reinforced his covering force by five battalions of about 3,750 men and rearranged his defenses. On the left, Terzi had 5,250 foot soldiers in seven regular battalions and 2,100 cavalry in 14 squadrons. The center under Clerfayt counted 6,650 foot and 1,800 horse. This force was made up of five grenadier battalions, two regular battalions, 1/3 of a battalion of Croats, four companies and six squadrons of French Royalists and six squadrons of cuirassiers. Bellegarde's right wing was composed of 4,500 infantry in seven regular battalions and 2,100 light cavalry in 14 squadrons. Altogether, the covering force numbered about 16,400 infantry and 6,000 cavalry.

According to Carnot, he argued that Wattignies on the Austrian left was the key to the position but that Jourdan wanted to attack the Austrian right. Phipps believed that Carnot's account was nonsense and that the course of the battle was typical of Jourdan's tactics. Jourdan's account only stated that he gave the order to attack Wattignies. Fromentin on the left was instructed not to mount a serious attack. Cordellier was ordered to act under Fromentin's orders and also reinforce Balland with three battalions and a cavalry regiment. Balland was directed to place nine battalions plus two cavalry regiments at Jourdan's disposal. The rest of Balland's division was to form line of battle and use its light troops to probe the enemy positions. The divisions of Beauregard and Duquesnoy numbered 16,000 soldiers, to these, Jourdan's special force added about 6,000 men.

On 16 October, Fromentin's two divisions on the left flank and Balland's division in the center skirmished all day. Bellegarde and Clerfayt held the bulk of their strength in their main positions. Jourdan mounted the main French assault against the height of Wattignies in three columns from Dimont, Dimechaux and Choisies. The main attack was also supported by additional artillery. When an early morning fog lifted in mid-morning, the French artillery opened a barrage on Wattignies. Duquesnoy's division formed the two right columns while Jourdan's detachment made up the left column. After being driven back twice by heavy fire, the French columns forced their way into Wattignies in the early afternoon. A counterattack from the northwest briefly pushed back the French, who were rallied by Jourdan. More French troops came up and defeated the Austrian attack. Duquesnoy sent Gratien's brigade forward but it was caught by Austrian cavalry in the open and thrown back. By this time, the French had dragged a battery up to the Wattignies heights to support the infantry. Under pressure from infantry and artillery, Terzi's division recoiled to the north. On the right of Duquesnoy, Beauregard's division attacked Obrechies, which was defended by Hadik with two battalions of regulars and eight squadrons of cavalry. As the French began breaking into the village, Hadik launched attacks from three directions at once, routing Beauregard's men. The French abandoned five cannon and fled back to Solrinnes. According to one observer, they did not stop until they reached Solre-le-Château.

=== Boussu ===
Far to the east, a column of French conscripts under Jacob Job Élie, set out from Philippeville toward Beaumont. In the early hours of 16 October, they were attacked by Coalition troops and fled. Élie managed to rally his soldiers and arrange them in two lines near Boussu-lez-Walcourt. At dawn when the Austrians attacked again, the second line fired a volley into the backs of the first line and all the infantry took to their heels. Louis Henri Loison capably covered the retreat with the French cavalry, saving the foot soldiers from being cut to pieces. As it was, Élie lost 400 men and 12 artillery pieces, while only 138 casualties were suffered by Benjowsky's division.

== Results ==
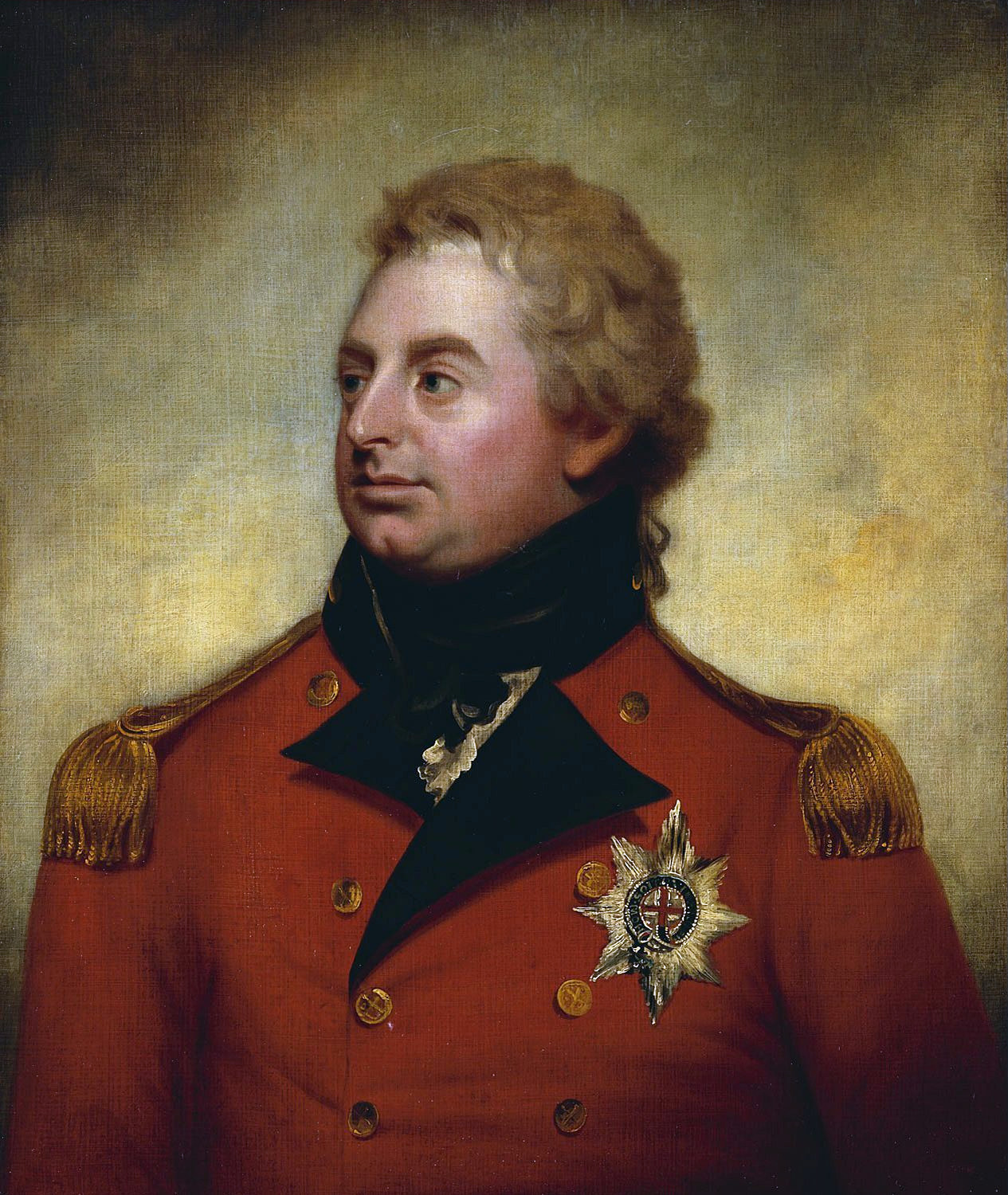
Duke of York

Prepared for a long battle, Jourdan reinforced Duquesnoy's division at Wattignies and ordered it to entrench. The Duke of York arrived from the northwest with 3,500 men to reinforce Coburg. The Austrian commander-in-chief had plenty of soldiers but the Prince of Orange denied a request to send any of his soldiers to the south side of the Sambre. Fearful of a sortie by the large garrison of Maubeuge, Coburg lifted the siege and retreated across the river at Hautmont and Buissière. Chancel recommended an attack on the retreating army but Ferrand declined to intervene. The Maubeuge garrison made a weak sortie on 15 October but remained inert the next day. On 17 October, the garrison sent out a column to the south to meet with Jourdan, instead of to the north after the retreating Coalition forces.

The Coalition reported losses of 365 killed, 1,753 wounded and 369 captured or missing, a total of 2,487 casualties. French losses were estimated at 3,000. Another authority numbered French losses as 5,000 killed, wounded and missing. The Austrians sustained 2,500 killed and wounded while an additional 500 men were captured. A third source also gave casualty figures of 5,000 French and 3,000 Austrians and added that the French lost 27 artillery pieces. A fourth source estimated losses as 3,000 on each side. For the poor performance of the Maubeuge garrison, Chancel was blamed, arrested, convicted and guillotined. For the rout of his brigade, Gratien was arrested but eventually acquitted. Claude Lecourbe distinguished himself in the attack on Wattignies on 16 October. Édouard Mortier was wounded at Dourlers on 15 October. Jean-Baptiste Bernadotte fought in Balland's division and Michel Ney was probably in Fromentin's division.

== Aftermath ==
Jourdan did not follow up his victory; after adding the Maubeuge garrison, he had about 60,000 French soldiers, opposed by 65,000 well-entrenched Coalition troops on the north bank of the Sambre, from Solesmes on the west to Thuin on the east. Though there was time for more operations, Coburg moved his army into winter quarters. While Jourdan was with the right wing of the Army of the North, the operations of the left wing under Davaine failed. Davaine was tried and executed at the same time as Chancel.

In Paris, Carnot demanded an advance on Charleroi and Jourdan tried to comply but found that the Coalition held all the river crossings and heavy rain had ruined the roads. After threatening to resign on 4 November, the army commander was recalled to Paris to speak with the Committee of Public Safety. This was the usual prelude to arrest and execution but Jourdan was allowed to return to the army and put his soldiers in winter quarters. After reinforcing the Army of the West and the Army of the Moselle each with 10,000 men, time was wasted in denouncing generals Duquesnoy, Meyer and Gudin. On 10 January 1794, Jourdan was accused of not protecting the frontier and summoned again to Paris. He was passionately defended by Representative Duquesnoy before the Committee of Public Safety and only dismissed from the army.

== Commentary ==
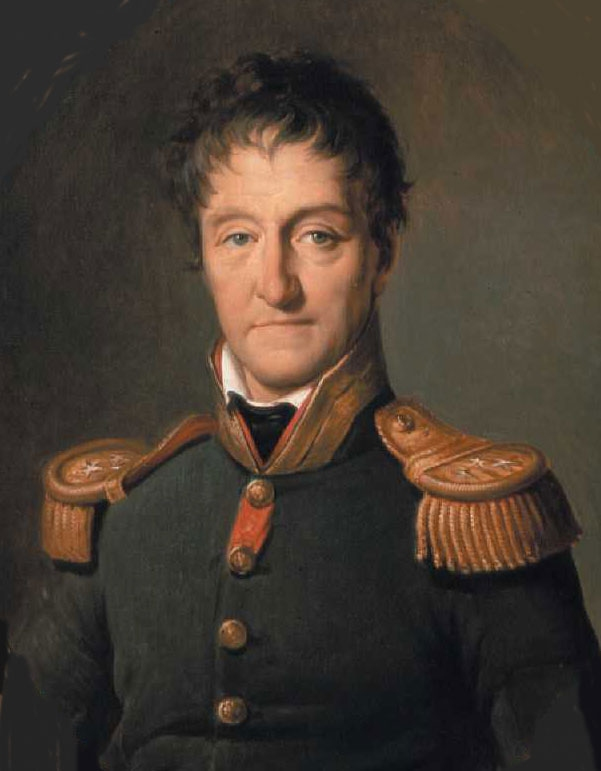
Lazare Carnot

The Carnot version of history is evident in the Encyclopædia Britannica (1911) account:

Jourdan wished to renew the left attack, but Carnot, the engineer, considered the Wattignies plateau the key of the position and his opinion prevailed. In the night the nearly equal partition of force, which was largely responsible for the failure, was modified, and the strength of the attack massed opposite Wattignies.

Historian Michael Glover presented Carnot as a meddler and wrote of the politically powerful Committee of Public Safety member,

Carnot's talents as 'the organizer of victory' are beyond dispute, but his tactical skills were minimal, a defect he concealed by a careful rewriting of history. To drive away a poorly led covering force of 20,000 with the 45,000 available to the Army of the North should have posed no great problem, but the business was sadly bungled. Carnot insisted that there should be a double encircling movement, a favorite maneuver of his, combined with a frontal attack, thus carefully dispersing the French numerical superiority.

Carnot believed that General Duquesnoy was capable but recognized that Balland and Fromentin were not very good generals and had no use at all for Cordellier. Phipps pointed out that none of Jourdan's division commanders fought under Napoleon. Jourdan later noted that Coburg erred by placing the Army of Observation too close to Maubeuge. He asserted that if Coburg had defended Avesnes-sur-Helpe, the relief army would have been in difficulty. He thought that Benjowsky's force should have been posted at Obrechies. A British observer, Harry Calvert credited the powerful French artillery for the victory. Louis Alexandre Andrault de Langeron, a French Royalist who emigrated to the Russian Empire attributed the Coalition failure to the Dunkirk expedition that split the army, the retreat from Maubeuge, chronic slowness and the "disastrous system of forming a cordon, which causes one to be weak everywhere".

Phipps summed up the failure of the Coalition with a cricket analogy.

The Allies totally failed to see that the best way to defend the length of the frontier was to concentrate and to crush Jourdan, and although they were well informed about his collecting troops at Guise, they allowed him to bring up slowly superior forces against one link of their long chain, as if their posts were so many players, each bound to defend his own wicket.

== Footnotes ==
Preceded by Siege of Mainz (1793)	French Revolution: Revolutionary campaigns Battle of Wattignies	Succeeded by Battle of Hondschoote
