= Jean-Baptiste Drouet =

Jean-Baptiste Drouet may refer to:

- Jean-Baptiste Drouet (revolutionary) (1763–1824), French politician of the 1789 Revolution
- Jean-Baptiste Drouet, Comte d'Erlon (1765–1844), marshal of France and a soldier in Napoleon's Army
