= Johann Friedrich Dryander =

German painter (1756–1812)

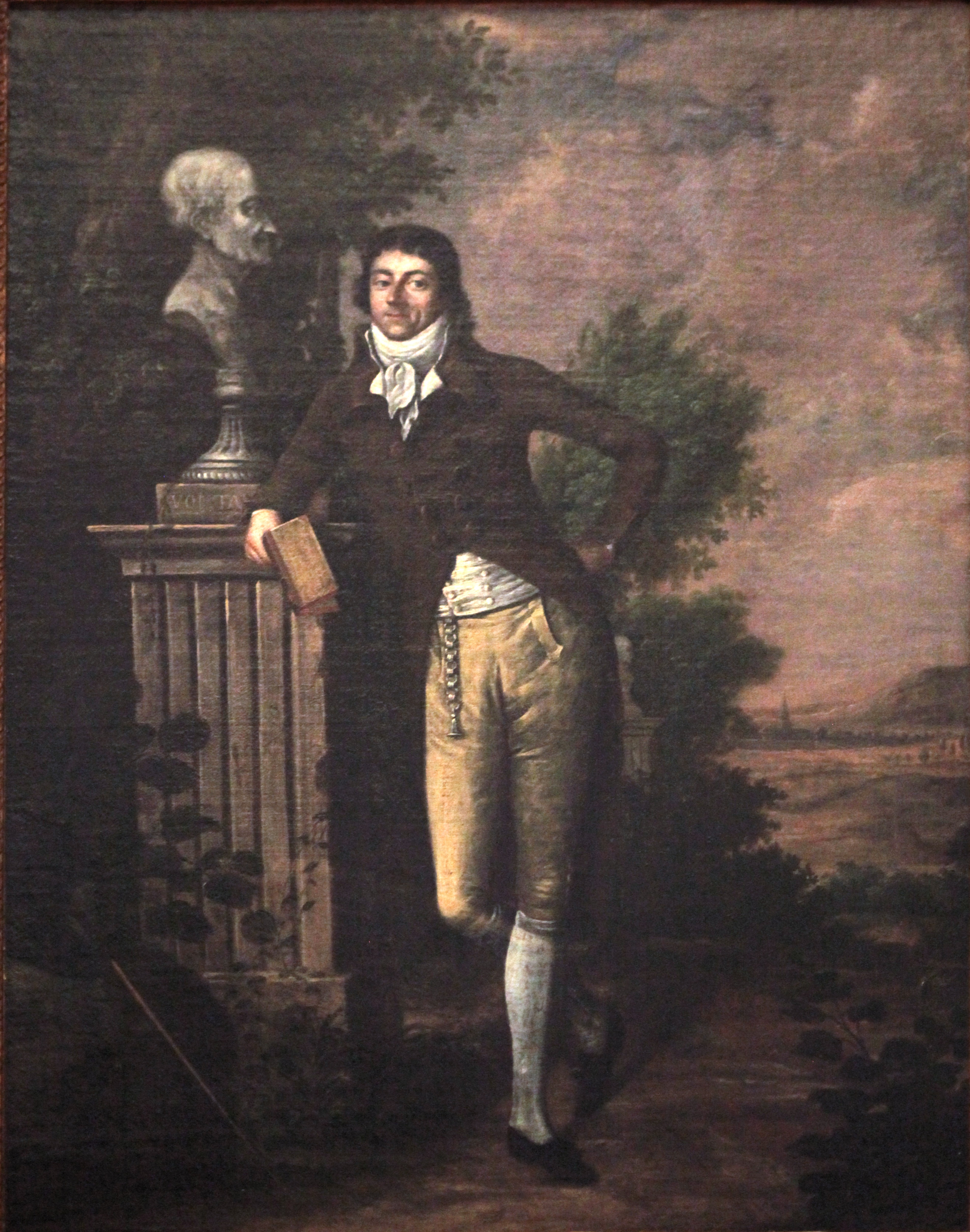
Portrait of Dominique Joseph Garat, (Musée de la Révolution française)

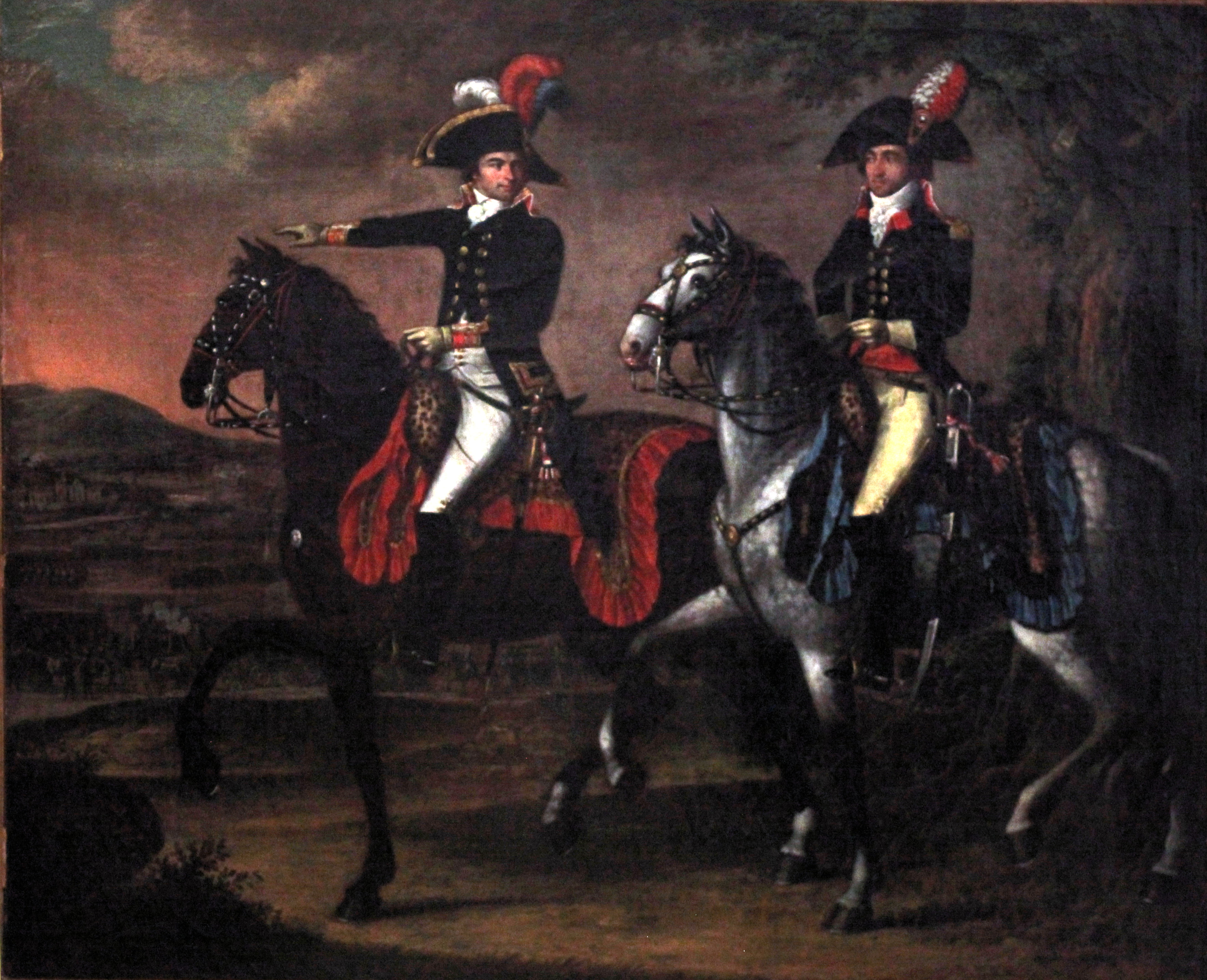
Portrait of General Jourdan and his adjutant

Johann Friedrich Dryander (26 April 1756, in Sankt Johann, Saarbrücken – 29 March 1812, in Sankt Johann, Saarbrücken) was a German painter.

== Work ==
Dryander created several portraits of French officers, notably:

- French troops before Saint-Jean-lès-Sarrebruck, on display at the Musée historique Lorrain in Nancy, 1804
- Portrait of a general, on display at the Fine Arts museum in Rouens
- Portrait du Général Bella. 1795, Salon-de-Provence
- Portrait du Citoyen Laboucly, Inspecteur de la Viande. 1794, Saarbrücken
- Portrait of Dominique Joseph Garat, 1794, Vizille, musée de la Révolution française
- Portrait du général Jourdan et de son adjudant. 1794, Vizille, musée de la Révolution française.

Two more are mentioned in the Dictionnaire des ventes d'art by Docteur Mireur, 1911:

- Portrait du colonel du 6° chasseurs. 1795, sold for 445 fr in December 1899, present whereabouts unknown.
- Général en chef et aide de camp. 1794, sold for 310 fr in 1899, present whereabouts unknown.

== Bibliography ==
- Lohmeyer: Die Kunst in Saarbrücken in Mitt. d. rhein. In: Vereins f. Denkmalplfege und Heimatschutz. VI, 1912, 1, p. 64.
- Ralph Melcher: Johann Friedrich Dryander ein Künstler zwischen Fürstenhof und Bürgerturm. Saarbrücken, Saarland museum 16 September 2006- 7 January 2007 (Catalogue of exhibition)

== See also ==
- List of German painters
