= Battle of Le Cateau (1794) =

1794 battle of the War of the First Coalition

Coordinates: 50°06′15″N 3°32′40″E

- Part of the War of the First Coalition
Date	29 March 1794
Location	Le Cateau-Cambrésis, France
Result	Coalition victory

Belligerents
(Habsburg monarchy) Habsburg Austria	(French First Republic) Republican France

Commanders and leaders
(Habsburg monarchy) Paul Kray	(French First Republic) Antoine Balland (French First Republic) Jacques Goguet (French First Republic) Jacques Fromentin

Strength
7,000	15,000

Casualties and losses
293	1,200, 4 guns

The Battle of Le Cateau (29 March 1794) took place at the start of the 1794 Flanders Campaign during the War of the First Coalition, part of the French Revolutionary Wars. It saw three Republican French divisions led by Antoine Balland, Jacques Gilles Henri Goguet and Jacques Fromentin attack a Habsburg Austrian force commanded by Paul Kray. The Austrians drove off the French and inflicted four French casualties for every Austrian casualty.

== The Action ==
Le Cateau-Cambrésis is located 24 kilometres (15 mi) southwest of Cambrai. Pre-empting the opening of the Allied offensive, the French launched an attack on Austrian positions at Le Cateau, and at Beauvais and Solesmes, two villages in the vicinity of Landrecies. These positions were carried by the Republicans, but Austrian cavalry were moved forward in advance of the forward units and charged. In the face of this counterattack, the French were stricken with panic and fled, leaving behind 5 guns and 400 dead. Many prisoners were taken, including sixty dragoons who had dismounted and run into a wood. Austrian losses in comparison were 120 men.

Three weeks later, the Coalition army would launch its spring offensive and open the Siege of Landrecies.
