= Neuf-Mesnil =

- Commune
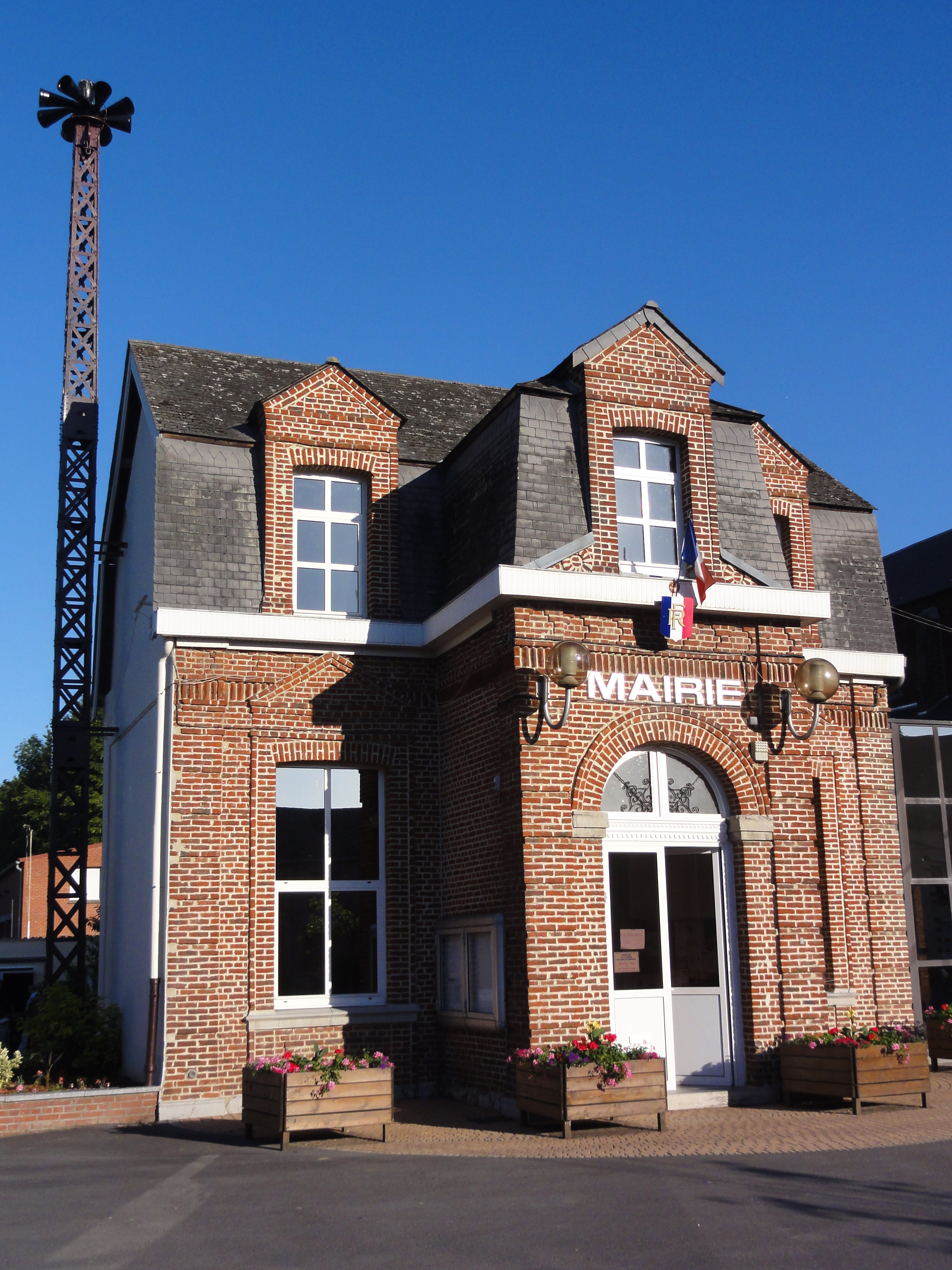
- The town hall in Neuf-Mesnil

- Coat of arms
- Location of Neuf-Mesnil
- Location within France Location within Hauts-de-France
- Coordinates: 50°15′58″N 3°54′29″E
- Country: France
- Region: Hauts-de-France
- Department: Nord
- Arrondissement: Avesnes-sur-Helpe
- Canton: Aulnoye-Aymeries
- Intercommunality: CA Maubeuge Val de Sambre

Government
  - Mayor (2020–2026): Daniel Leferme
- Area^{1}: 1.21 km^{2} (0.47 sq mi)
- Elevation: 150 m (490 ft)
- Highest elevation: 163 m (535 ft)
- Lowest elevation: 140 m (460 ft)
- Population (2023): 1,286
  - Density: 1,060/km^{2} (2,750/sq mi)
- Time zone: UTC+01:00 (CET)
  - Summer (DST): UTC+02:00 (CEST)
- INSEE/Postal code: 59424 /59330
- ^{1} French Land Register data, which excludes lakes, ponds, glaciers > 1 km^{2} (0.386 sq mi or 247 acres) and river estuaries.

Neuf-Mesnil (French pronunciation: [nœf mɛnil]) is a commune in the Nord department in northern France.

== Heraldry ==
Arms of Neuf-Mesnil	The arms of Neuf-Mesnil are blazoned : Gules, a bend vair. (Neuf-Mesnil and Wattignies-la-Victoire use the same arms.)

== See also ==
- Communes of the Nord department
