= Claude François Duprès =

French general

Claude-François Duprès
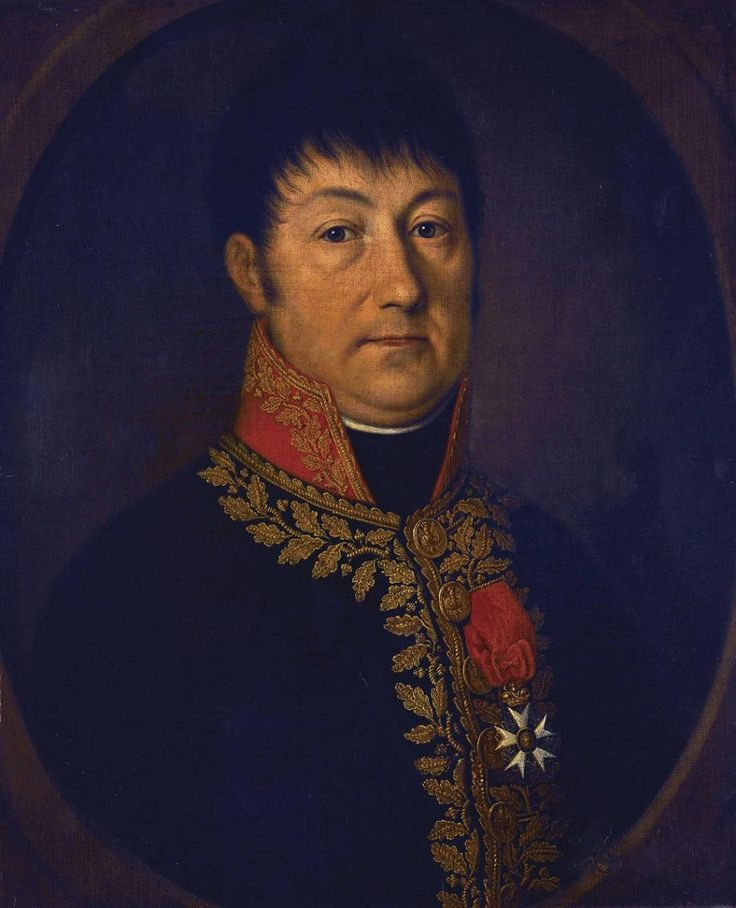
- General of Brigade Claude François Duprès
- Born: October 3, 1755; Fort-Louis, Alsace, France
- Died: July 21, 1808 (aged 52); Bailén, Spain
- Military career
- Allegiance: Kingdom of France, French First Republic, First French Empire
- Branch: Cavalry
- Active: 1776-1808
- Rank: Général de brigade
- Conflicts: French Revolutionary Wars; Battle of Arlon; Napoleonic Wars; Battle of Marengo; Peninsular War; Battle of Bailén †
- Awards: Commander of the Légion d'honneur Baron d'Empire

Claude François Dupré or Claude François Duprès (French pronunciation: [klod fʁɑ̃swa dypʁɛ]; 3 October 1755 – 21 July 1808) was a French general.

Born in Fort-Louis, Bas-Rhin, he first joined up in 1776 and served in the armies of the French Revolution and First French Empire. He was killed at the Battle of Bailén in Bailén, Andalucia.

== See also ==
- List of French generals of the Revolutionary and Napoleonic Wars

== Sources ==
- Six, Georges (1934). Dictionnaire biographique des généraux et amiraux de la Révolution et de l'Empire, Vol. I (in French). Paris, France: Librairie historique et nobiliaire. ISBN 978-2-402-49916-3.
