= Jourdan law =

1798 law institutionalizing conscription in Revolutionary France

The Jourdan Law of 5 September 1798 (French: loi Jourdan-Delbrel) effectively institutionalised conscription in Revolutionary France, which began with the levée en masse. It stipulated that all single and childless men between the ages of 20 and 25 were liable for military service. Exemptions existed however for the clergy, industrial workers essential for the war effort, students from selected Grandes écoles (higher-education institutions), and public office holders. The law discriminated against the poor and large peasant population through the legally sanctioned practice of 'replacement', which allowed anyone who was able, to purchase someone to enlist in their place. It was named for the French General Jean-Baptiste Jourdan.

Proposed under the Directory by deputies Jean-Baptiste Jourdan and Pierre Delbrel, it was intended to deal with the great demobilization following 9 Thermidor – 700,000 men in 1794, 380,000 in 1797.

This law enabled Napoleon Bonaparte to supply the armies until 1815.

== Extracts from the Law ==
Title I: Principles

- "Every Frenchman is a soldier and must defend the country." (article 1)
- "Outside of the case of danger to the country, the army is formed from voluntary enrollment and by way of military conscription." (article 3)

Title II : Voluntary Enrollments

- May voluntarily enter the French army if between the ages of 18 and 30, with a certificate of good conduct signed by the mayor of their municipality and the justice of the peace.
- The act of voluntary enrollment is registered in town hall. It mentions the citizen's identity, size, home and physical description.

Title III : Military Conscription

- "Military conscription includes all French people (men) from 20 to 25 years of age." (article 15)

Title IV : Execution

- The administrations of communes and townships must have "lists on which all French (men) of their district are registered" who are 20 years old. (article 24).
- From these lists, the central administrations classify the general lists of the conscripts of their respective departments (article 26).
