= Jean-Baptiste Jourdan =

French Marshal (1762–1833)

Marshal of the Empire Jean-Baptiste Jourdan
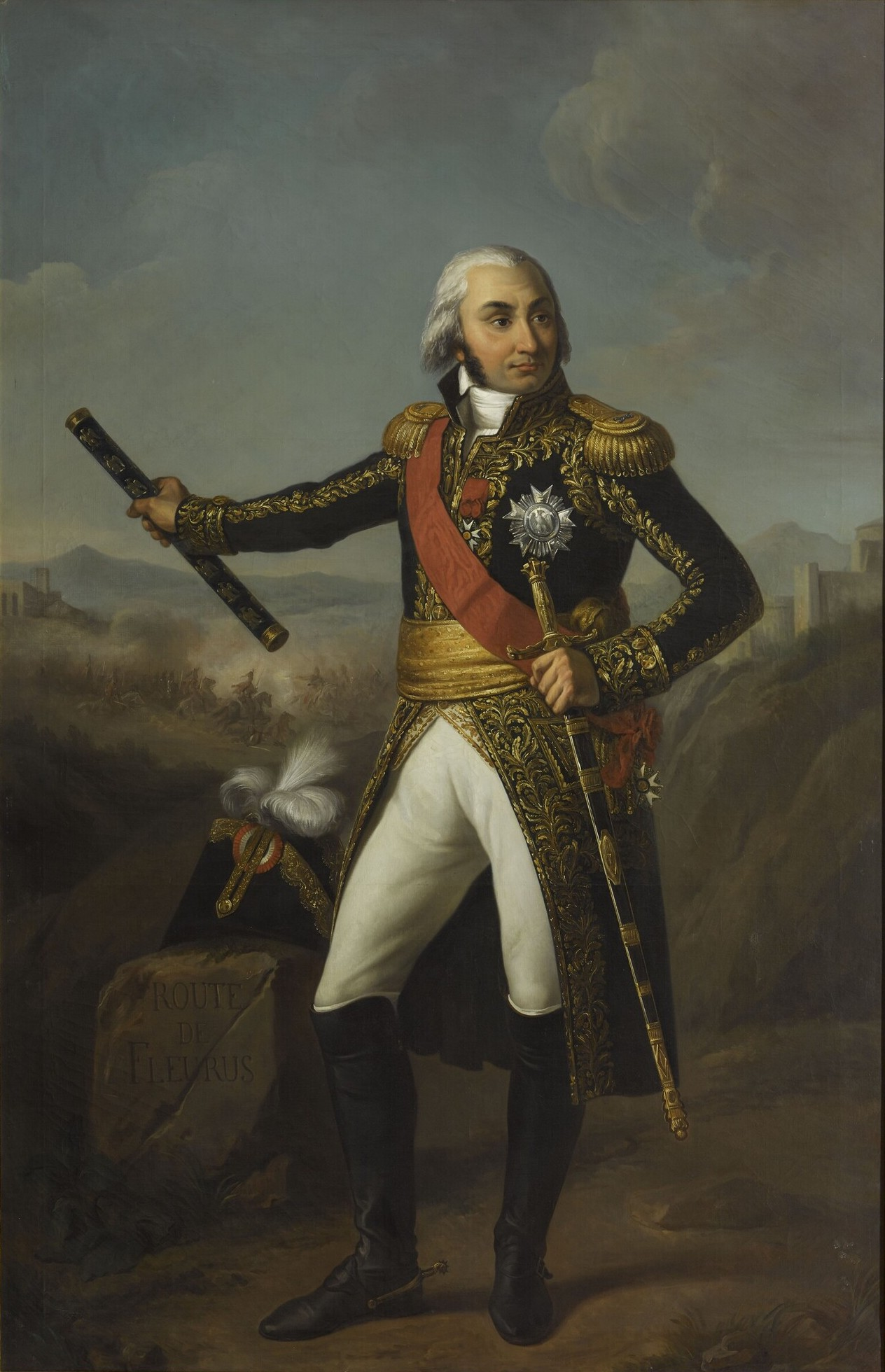
- Portrait by Joseph-Marie Vien, c. 1805
- Born: 29 April 1762; Limoges, France
- Died: 23 November 1833 (aged 71); Paris, France
- Military career
- Allegiance: France
- Branch: French Army
- Service years: 1778–1784; 1790–1815
- Rank: Marshal of the Empire
- Nickname: The victor of Fleurus
- Conflicts: See list: American Revolutionary War; Capture of Grenada; Siege of Savannah; Invasion of Tobago; French Revolutionary Wars; Battle of Jemappes; Battle of Neerwinden; Battle of Hondschoote; Battle of Wattignies; Battle of Fleurus; Battle of Sprimont; Battle of Aldenhoven; Siege of Luxembourg; Battle of Wetzlar; Battle of Amberg; Battle of Würzburg; Battle of Limburg; Battle of Ostrach; Battle of Stockach; Napoleonic Wars; Battle of Talavera; Battle of Vitoria
- Awards: Grand Cross of the Legion of Honour; Grand Cross of the Order of Saint Hubert; Grand Dignitary of the Royal Order of the Two-Sicilies; Knight of the Order of Saint Louis; Knight of the Order of the Holy Spirit
- Other work: Deputy in the Council of Five Hundred; Governor of Les Invalides (1830–1833)

Jean-Baptiste Jourdan, 1st Count Jourdan (English: /ʒʊərˈdɑːn/ zhoor-DAHN, French: [ʒɑ̃ batist ʒuʁdɑ̃]; 29 April 1762 – 23 November 1833), was a French military commander who served during the French Revolutionary Wars and the Napoleonic Wars. He was made a Marshal of the Empire by Emperor Napoleon I in 1804. He was also a Jacobin politician during the Directory phase of the French Revolution, serving as member of the Council of Five Hundred between 1797 and 1799.

One of the most successful commanders of the French Revolutionary Army, Jourdan is best remembered in the Revolution for leading the French to a decisive victory over the First Coalition at the Battle of Fleurus, during the Flanders campaign. However, Jourdan suffered a number of defeats while encountering Archduke Charles, Duke of Teschen during the Rhine campaign of 1796. Under the Empire he was rewarded by Napoleon with the title of Marshal and continued to hold military assignments, but suffered a major defeat at the Battle of Vitoria, which resulted in the Empire's permanent loss of Spain. In 1815 he became reconciled with the Bourbon Restoration, and later supported the July Revolution and served in his last years as governor of the Hôtel des Invalides.

== Early life ==
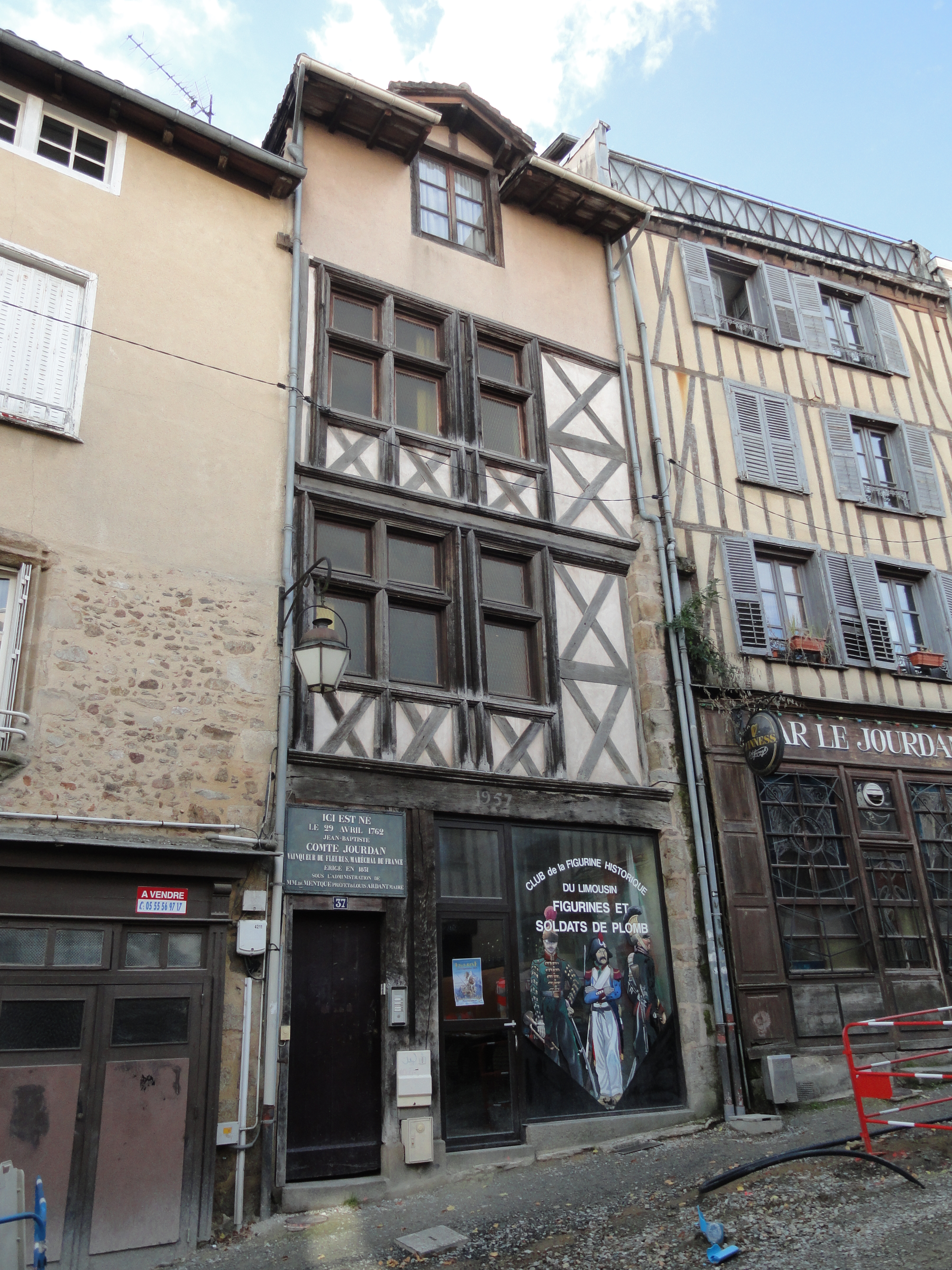
Jourdan's birth home in Limoges, with a commemorative plaque installed during the Second Republic

Jourdan was born in Limoges, in the province of Limousin, on 29 April 1762. He was the only surviving child of Roch Jourdan, a surgeon originally from Meyrargues, and Jeanne Foreau-Franciquet. His mother died at childbirth when he was two years old, and after being raised by his father for a few years, Jourdan was put under the care of an uncle, the Abbé Laurent Jourdan, a parish priest who ran a boarding school in Beaurecueil, in Provence. His father died when he was nine years old, at around 1771, leaving Jourdan as an impoverished orphan.

After finishing his basic education at the school in Beaurecueil, at fifteen years old Jourdan was sent to the care of another uncle, Jean-François Jourdan, a cloth merchant in Lyon and disciplinarian employer. Working as an apprentice clerk at the clothing shop, Jourdan endured for about a year in Lyon before enlisting in the Royal army in 1778, joining the regiment of Auxerrois stationed in the Île de Ré, which was destined for service in the American War of Independence.

== American Revolutionary War ==
Jourdan spent the rest of the year with the regiment in Île de Ré before it departed for the war in America. He first saw action at the capture of Granada in mid-1779. A few months later the Auxerrois regiment was put under the command of the Comte d'Estaing, and in this assignment Jourdan soon participated in the ill-fated assault at the Siege of Savannah, in October 1779. Through the next years he served in the West Indies. He took part in the successful defense of the recently captured island of Saint Vincent, in 1780, and in the invasion of Tobago in 1781.

During his duty in the West Indies, Jourdan fell ill with what was officially diagnosed as hernia, though it was likely an intestinal disease, and bouts of illness troubled him for the rest of his military career. Due to this period of poor health he missed most of the campaigns of 1782, only returning to the army at the end of the year.

=== Return to Limoges ===
In June 1784, Jourdan was demobilized from the Royal army in Verdun, and, after a period of unemployment, returned to his native Limoges and found work at a cloth merchant's shop, where he proved to be an excellent employee. He married Jeanne Nicolas Avanturier, the sister of his boss, in Limoges on 22 January 1788, and the couple had six children.

== War of the First Coalition ==
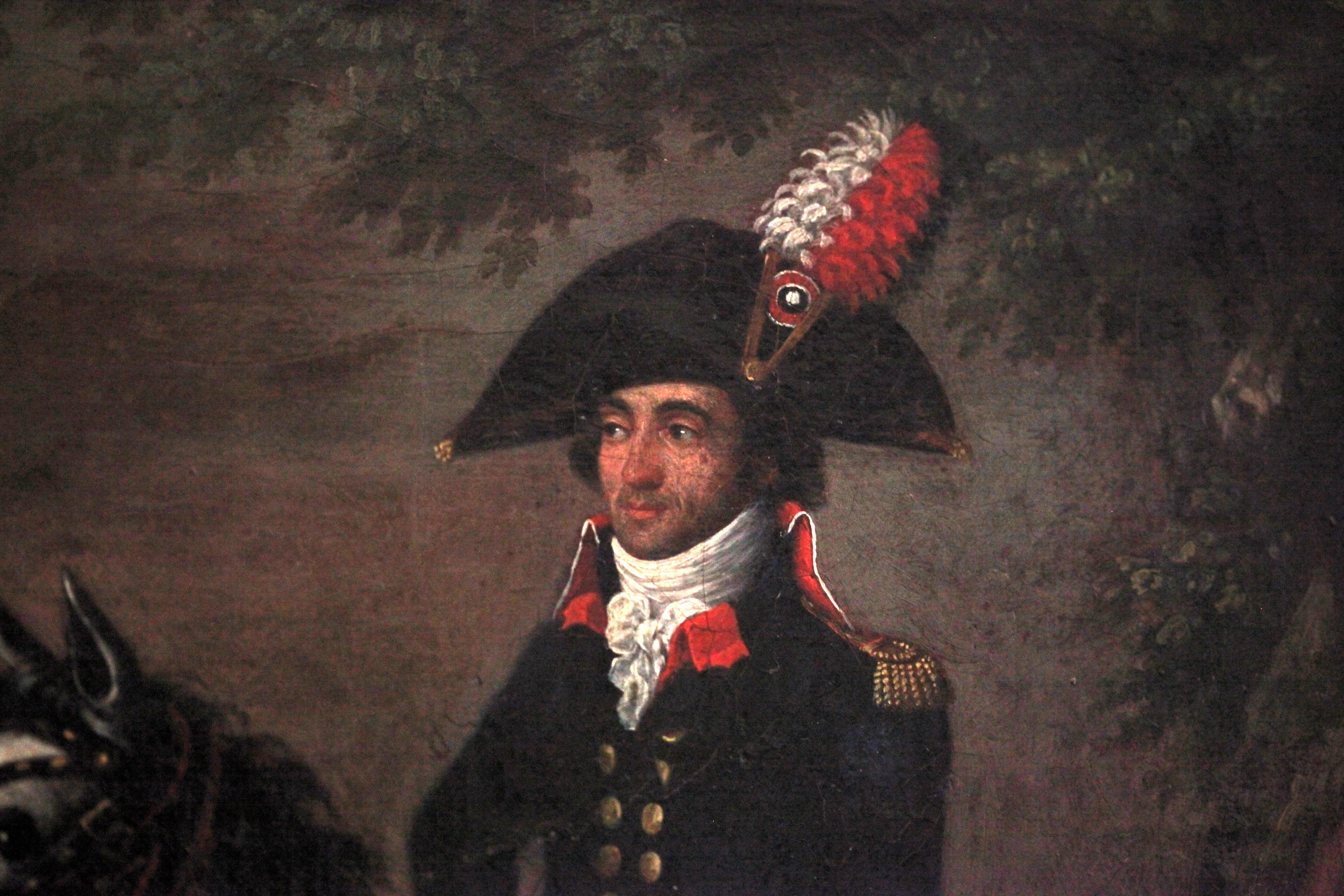
Detail of an equestrian portrait of Jourdan by Johann Dryander, 1794

Jourdan welcomed the French Revolution with enthusiasm. He was appointed lieutenant of the chasseurs of the National Guard in 1790, and when the National Assembly asked for volunteers, Jourdan was elected commander of the 9th battalion of volunteers from Haute-Vienne. He led his troops in the French victory at the Battle of Jemappes on 6 November 1792 and in the defeat at the Battle of Neerwinden on 18 March 1793. Jourdan's leadership skills were noticed and led to his promotion to Brigade general on 27 May 1793 and to general of division two months later. On 8 September, he led his division at the Battle of Hondschoote, in which he was wounded in the chest. On 22 September, he was named to lead the Army of the North. Three of his predecessors, Nicolas Luckner, Adam Philippe, Comte de Custine, and Jean Nicolas Houchard were under arrest and later executed by guillotine.

Jourdan's first assignment was to relieve General Jacques Ferrand's 20,000-man garrison of Maubeuge which was besieged by an Austrian-Dutch army commanded by Prince Josias of Saxe-Coburg-Saalfeld. The Committee of Public Safety felt that this mission was so important that it dispatched Lazare Carnot to oversee the operation. Jourdan defeated Coburg on 15–16 October at the Battle of Wattignies and broke the siege. Carnot claimed that it was his own intervention that won the victory. Historian Michael Glover writes that the first day's attack was a failure because of Carnot's interference, while the second day's success resulted from Jourdan using his own tactical judgment. In any case, only Carnot's account reached Paris.

On 10 January 1794, after refusing to carry out an impossible order, Jourdan was brought before the Committee of Public Safety. Carnot presented Jourdan's arrest warrant, which was signed by Maximilien de Robespierre, Bertrand Barère, and Jean-Marie Collot d'Herbois. Jourdan was saved from certain execution when an eyewitness, representative on mission Ernest Joseph Duquesnoy rose and contradicted Carnot's version of events at Wattignies. Spared from arrest, Jourdan was nevertheless dismissed from the army and sent home.

The government soon recalled Jourdan to lead the Army of the Moselle. In May, he was ordered north with the left wing of the Army of the Moselle. This force was combined with the Army of the Ardennes and the right wing of the Army of the North to form an army which did not officially become the Army of Sambre-et-Meuse until 29 June 1794. With 70,000 soldiers of the new army, Jourdan laid siege to Charleroi on 12 June. A 41,000-man Austrian-Dutch army under the Hereditary Prince of Orange defeated the French at the Battle of Lambusart on 16 June and drove them south of the Sambre River. Casualties numbered 3,000 for each army. Undeterred, Jourdan immediately marched on Namur to the east-northeast of Charleroi. Instead of attacking Namur, he suddenly swung west and appeared to the north of Charleroi. After a brief siege, the 3,000-man Austrian garrison of Charleroi surrendered on 25 June. Military strategist B. H. Liddell Hart cited Jourdan's maneuver as an example of the indirect approach, even though it was probably inadvertent on the French general's part. Too late to save Charlerloi, Coburg's 46,000-strong army attacked Jourdan's 75,000 French on 26 June. The Battle of Fleurus proved to be a strategic French victory when Coburg called off his attacks and retreated. During the battle, the Allied attacks pushed back both French flanks, but Jourdan stubbornly fought it out and was saved when General François Joseph Lefebvre's division held its ground in the center.

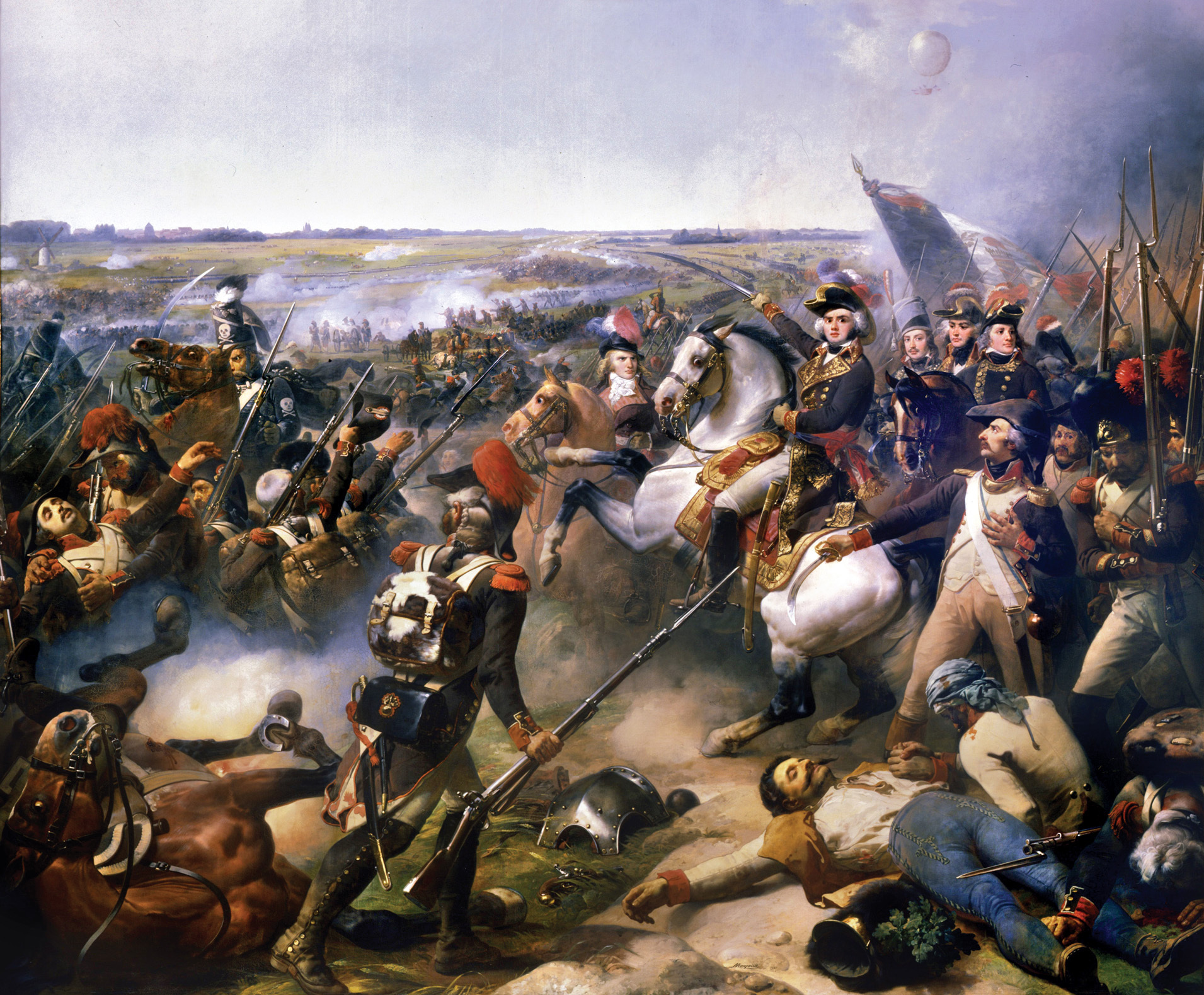
The Battle of Fleurus in 1794, won by Jourdan over Coalition forces led by the princes of Coburg and Orange

After Fleurus, the Allied position in the Austrian Netherlands collapsed. The Austrian Army evacuated Belgium and the Dutch Republic was dissolved by the advancing French armies in 1795. On 7 June 1795, Jourdan's army concluded the long but successful Siege of Luxembourg. Operations east of the Rhine were less successful that year, with the French capturing, then losing Mannheim.

In the Rhine campaign of 1796, Jourdan's Army of Sambre-et-Meuse formed the left wing of the advance into Bavaria. The whole of the French forces were ordered to advance on Vienna, Jourdan on the extreme left, General Jean Victor Marie Moreau in the centre by the Danube valley, and Napoleon on the right in Italy. The campaign began brilliantly, with the Austrians under Archduke Charles being driven back by Moreau and Jourdan almost to the Austrian frontier. But Charles, slipping away from Moreau, threw his whole weight on Jourdan, who was defeated at the Battle of Amberg in August. Jourdan failed to salvage the situation at the Battle of Würzburg and was forced over the Rhine after the Battle of Limburg, which cost the life of General François Séverin Marceau. Moreau had to fall back in turn, and the operations of the year in Germany were a failure. The chief cause of defeat was the plan of campaign imposed upon the generals by their government. Jourdan was nevertheless made the scapegoat and was not employed for two years. In those years he became prominent as a politician and above all as the framer of the famous conscription law of 1798, which came to be known as the Jourdan Law.

== War of the Second Coalition ==
When war was renewed in 1799, Jourdan was at the head of the army on the Rhine, but again suffered defeat at the hands of Archduke Charles at the battles of Ostrach and Stockach in late March. Disappointed and broken in health, he handed over command to General André Masséna. He resumed his political duties and was a prominent opponent of the Coup of 18 Brumaire, after which he was expelled from the Council of Five Hundred. Soon, however, he became formally reconciled to the new régime, and accepted from Napoleon fresh military and civil employment. In 1800, Jourdan became inspector-general of cavalry and infantry and representative of French interests in the Cisalpine Republic.

== Napoleonic Wars ==
In 1804, Napoleon appointed Jourdan as a Marshal of the Empire. He remained in the newly created Kingdom of Italy until 1806, when Joseph Bonaparte, whom his brother made King of Naples that year, selected Jourdan as his military adviser. He followed Joseph into Spain in 1808; but Joseph's throne had to be maintained by the French Army, and throughout the Peninsular War, the other marshals, who depended directly upon Napoleon, paid little heed either to Joseph or to Jourdan. Jourdan was blamed for the defeat at the Battle of Talavera in 1809 and replaced by Marshal Jean-de-Dieu Soult. He was reinstated as Joseph's chief of staff in September 1811 but given few troops. After the disastrous French defeat at the Battle of Salamanca in July 1812, Joseph and Jourdan were forced to abandon Madrid and retreat to Valencia. Joining with Soult's army, which evacuated Andalusia, the French were able to recapture Madrid during the Siege of Burgos and push Wellington's Anglo-Portuguese army back to Portugal.

The following year, Wellington advanced again with a large, well-organized army. Repeatedly outmaneuvering the French, the Anglo-Allied army forced Joseph and Jourdan to fight at the Battle of Vitoria on 21 June 1813, during which his marshal's baton was captured by the British. After the French decisive defeat, which resulted in the permanent loss of Spain, Jourdan held no important commands up to the fall of the French Empire. He adhered to the first Bourbon Restoration, in 1814, but joined Napoleon on his return to power during the Hundred Days and was appointed commander of Besançon.

== Later life ==
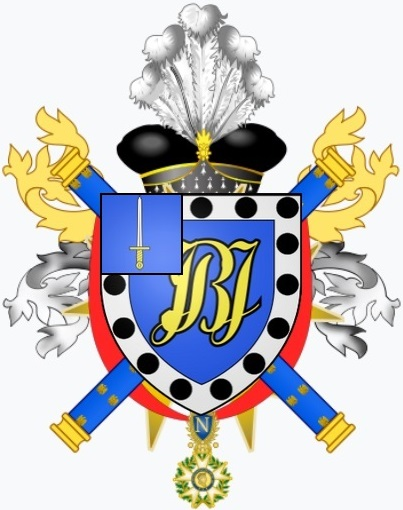
Heraldic achievement of Jean-Baptiste Jourdan as comte de l’Empire, 1804

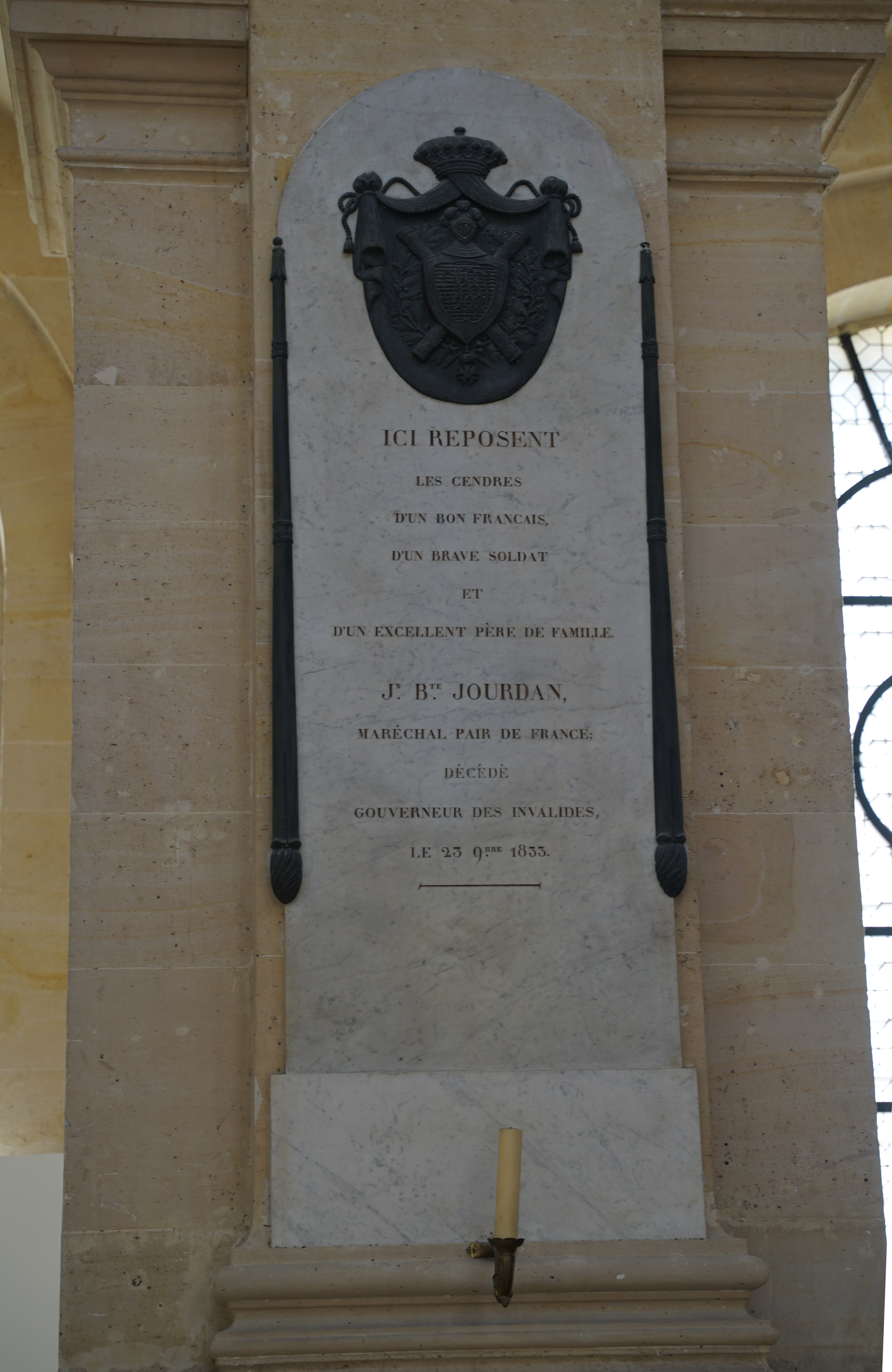
Jourdan's grave inside the Cathedral of Saint-Louis des Invalides

Jourdan submitted to the Bourbons again after the final French defeat at the Battle of Waterloo. Afterwards he refused to be a member of the court which sentenced Marshal Michel Ney to death. He was made a count (comte de l’Empire) in 1804, a Peer of France in 1819, and governor of Grenoble in 1816. In politics, Jourdan was a prominent opponent of the royalist reactionaries and supported the Revolution of 1830. After this event, he held the portfolio of foreign affairs for a few days and then became governor of the Hôtel des Invalides, a post he held until his death. Jourdan died in Paris on 23 November 1833 and was buried in Les Invalides.

While in exile on Saint Helena, Napoleon admitted,

I certainly used that man very ill ... I have learned with pleasure that since my fall he invariably acted in the best manner. He has thus afforded an example of that praiseworthy elevation of mind which distinguishes men one from another. Jourdan is a true patriot; and that is the answer to many things that have been said of him.

Jourdan wrote Opérations de l'armée du Danube ("Operations of the Army of the Danube", 1799), Mémoires pour servir a l'histoire sur la campagne de 1796 ("Memoirs to serve history of the campaign of 1796", 1819), and unpublished personal memoirs.
