= Wattignies-la-Victoire =

- Commune
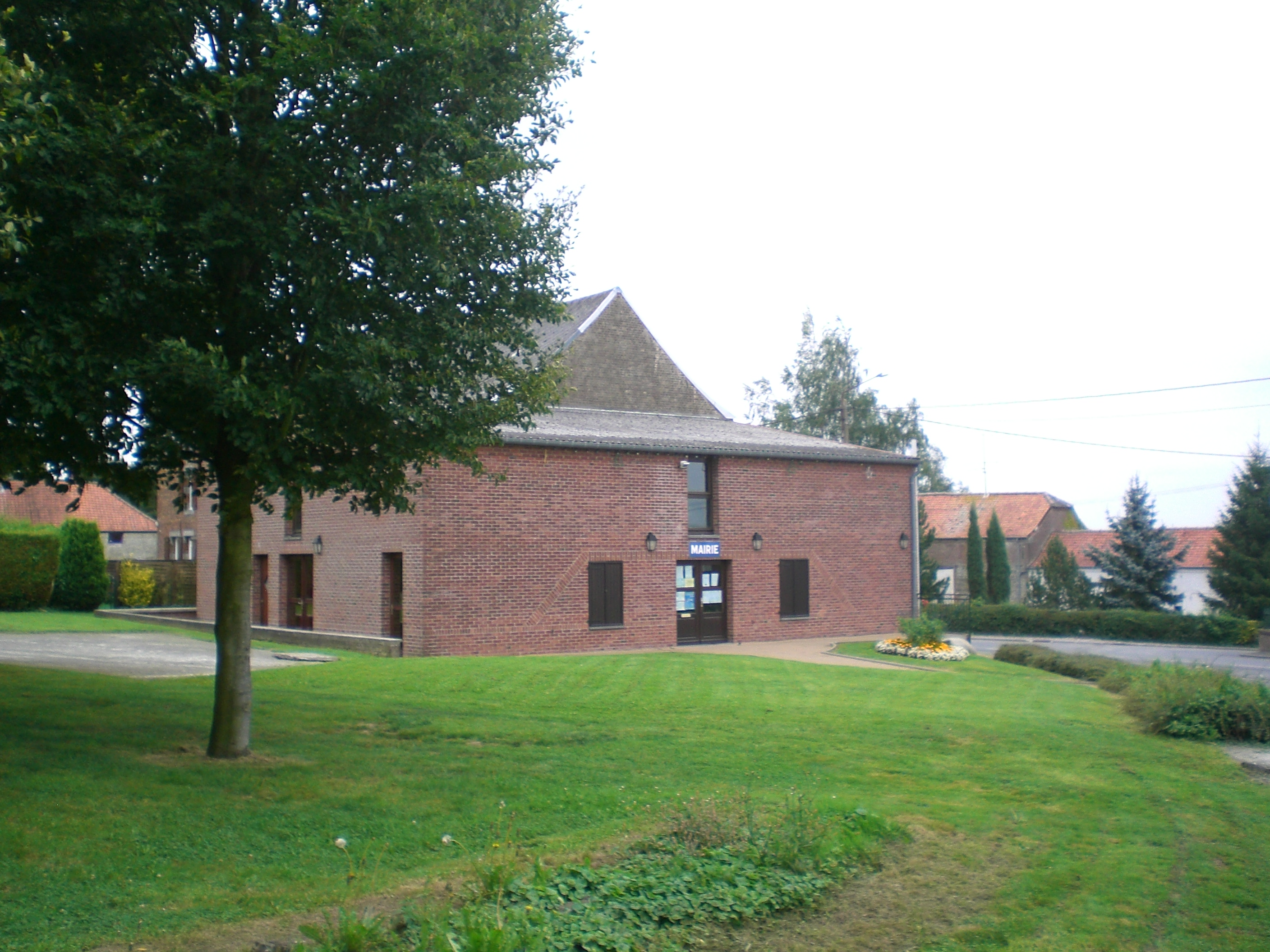
- The town hall in Wattignies-la-Victoire

- Coat of arms
- Location of Wattignies-la-Victoire
- Location within France Location within Hauts-de-France
- Coordinates: 50°12′05″N 4°00′48″E
- Country: France
- Region: Hauts-de-France
- Department: Nord
- Arrondissement: Avesnes-sur-Helpe
- Canton: Fourmies
- Intercommunality: Cœur de l'Avesnois

Government
  - Mayor (2020–2026): Vincent Quevallier
- Area^{1}: 6.31 km^{2} (2.44 sq mi)
- Elevation: 206 m (676 ft)
- Highest elevation: 205 m (673 ft)
- Lowest elevation: 147 m (482 ft)
- Population (2023): 240
  - Density: 38/km^{2} (99/sq mi)
- Time zone: UTC+01:00 (CET)
  - Summer (DST): UTC+02:00 (CEST)
- INSEE/Postal code: 59649 /59680
- ^{1} French Land Register data, which excludes lakes, ponds, glaciers > 1 km^{2} (0.386 sq mi or 247 acres) and river estuaries.

Wattignies-la-Victoire (French pronunciation: [watiɲi la viktwaʁ]) is a commune in the Nord department of northern France. It is close to the site of the Battle of Wattignies, fought in 1793 during the French Revolutionary Wars, in which the French scored a victory over Austria.

== Heraldry ==
Arms of Wattignies-la-Victoire	The arms of Wattignies-la-Victoire are blazoned : Gules, a bend vair. (Neuf-Mesnil and Wattignies-la-Victoire use the same arms.)

== Population ==
Historical population
Year	Pop.	±% p.a.
1968	238	—
1975	216	−1.38%
1982	239	+1.46%
1990	224	−0.81%
1999	233	+0.44%
2007	270	+1.86%
2012	250	−1.53%
2017	243	−0.57%
2023	240	−0.21%
Source: INSEE

== See also ==
- Communes of the Nord department
