= Florent Joseph Duquesnoy =

- Born: 27 February 1761; Bouvigny-Boyeffles, France
- Died: 1 July 1801 (aged 40); Aix-Noulette, Nord-Pas-de-Calais, France
- Military career
- Allegiance: Kingdom of France; France
- Branch: Cavalry, Infantry
- Service years: (Kingdom of France) 1782–1790 (France) 1792–1796
- Rank: General of Division
- Conflicts: War of the First Coalition; Battle of Hondschoote; Battle of Wattignies; War in the Vendée

Florent Joseph Duquesnoy (27 February 1761 – 1 July 1801) became a French general officer during the French Revolutionary Wars and led a division at the Battle of Wattignies.

== Career ==
Duquesnoy was born to a farmer in Bouvigny-Boyeffles, France on 27 February 1761. He was the brother of Ernest Dominique Francois Joseph Duquesnoy who later became a representative of the French First Republic. He enlisted in the Carabiniers-à-Cheval in 1782 but was discharged in 1790. He became captain in the 4th Pas-de-Calais National Guard Battalion on 28 January 1792. He transferred to the 4th Chasseurs Battalion on 16 November that year. He was promoted to general of brigade on 30 July 1793 and put in charge of the camp of Cassel in August. He assumed the rank of general of division on 3 September 1793, despite the pleas of his brother not to promote him. After the Battle of Wattignies on 15–16 October 1793, he was transferred to the Army of the West on 27 November to fight in the War in the Vendée. He was suspended on 14 May 1795 and placed on inactive status on 1 January 1796. He died on 1 July 1801.
