= Jacques Fromentin =

Jacques Pierre Fromentin
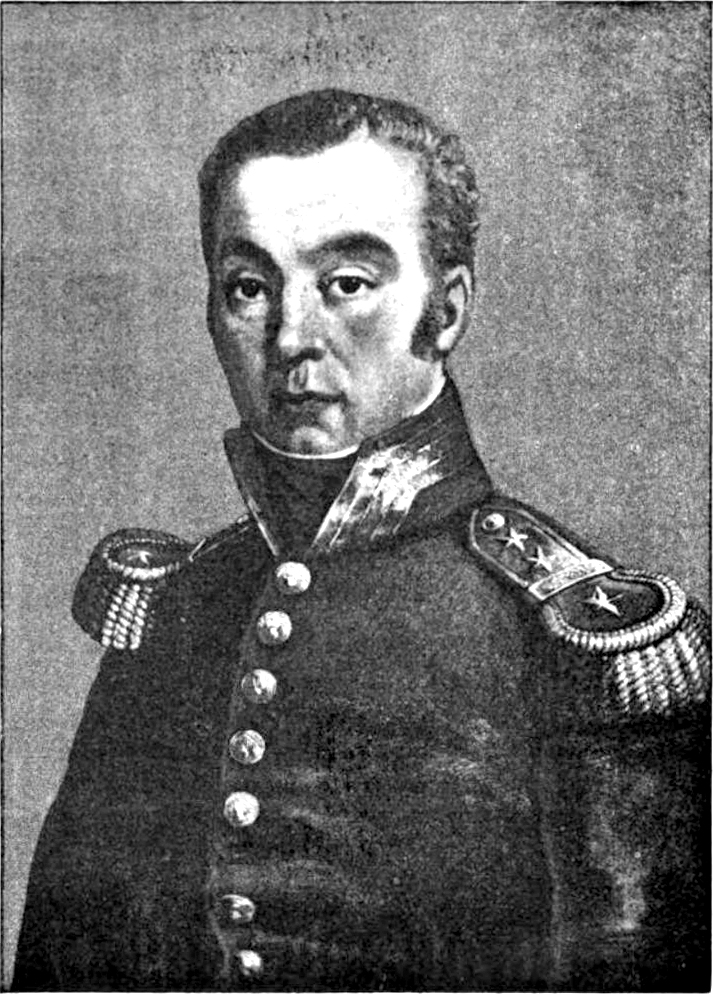
- Born: 2 August 1754; Alençon, France
- Died: 19 October 1830 (aged 76); Marbaix, Nord, France
- Military career
- Allegiance: Kingdom of France; France
- Service years: (Kingdom of France) 1778–1787 (France) 1791–1799
- Rank: General of Division
- Conflicts: American Revolutionary War; Battle of Sadras; Battle of Providien; Battle of Trincomalee; War of the First Coalition; Battle of Hondschoote; Battle of Wattignies; Battle of Le Cateau; Battle of Beaumont; Battle of Grandreng; Battle of Erquelinnes; Battle of Gosselies

Jacques Pierre Fromentin (2 August 1754 – 19 October 1830) led a French division during the Flanders Campaign of 1793–1794. Having served in the French Royal Army for ten years, he was appointed lieutenant colonel of a volunteer battalion in 1791. The mass emigration of aristocratic generals, and suspicion of those who stayed, left the French First Republic desperate to create new general officers, preferably from non-nobles. After leading his battalion at Hondschoote, Fromentin was very rapidly promoted to general of division in September 1793 and led a division at Wattignies the following month. In 1794, he led a combat division at Le Cateau, Beaumont, Grandreng, Erquelinnes and Gosselies. After the battle of Gosselies, in which his division crumbled and routed, he was relieved of duty and stripped of rank in the ensuing scapegoat hunt after being accused of intoxication, though his rank was reinstated after he, through his father's intercession, was able to prove his weakness at the battle was the result of a starvation diet prescribed as treatment for his haemorrhoids, rather than by alcohol. Nevertheless, by this time, it was plain that he had only modest military ability and he was never given a field command again. He served as a fortress commandant in 1794 and 1795 before retiring from the army in 1799.
