= Jean-Baptiste Drouet (revolutionary) =

French politician (1763–1824)

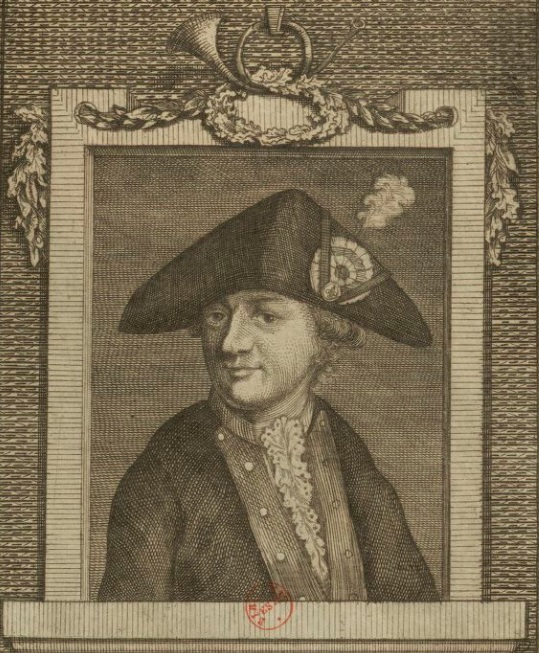
- Portrait of Drouet in 1791, published with a caption reporting his role in the Flight to Varennes

Deputy in the National Convention
- In office 3 September 1792 – 26 October 1795
- Constituency: Marne

Deputy in the Council of Five Hundred
- In office 13 October 1795 – 20 May 1797
- Constituency: Marne

Deputy in the Chamber of Representatives
- In office 15 May 1815 – 13 July 1815
- Constituency: Marne

Personal details
- Born: 8 January 1763 Sainte-Menehould
- Died: 11 April 1824 (aged 61) Mâcon
- Party: Left; The Mountain (National Convention)
- Known for: Recognizing King Louis XVI during the Flight to Varennes
- Awards: Knight of the Legion of Honor

Jean-Baptiste Drouet (8 January 1763 – 11 April 1824) was a French politician of the Revolution and the Empire, best known for his key role in the arrest of King Louis XVI and his family during the Flight to Varennes.

== Background ==
Drouet was born at Sainte-Menehould, in the province of Champagne. He enlisted in the Condé-Dragons regiment in 1781, but left seven years later to help his father in his duties as postmaster of Sainte-Menehould.

== Flight to Varennes ==
On 21 June 1791, at around 8.p.m, the berline carrying the disguised royal family on their flight to the frontier made a stop at Sainte-Menehould. About 13 hours earlier, a valet de chambre in the Tuileries had noticed the king's disappearance and alerted the authorities. Shortly after the royal family's arrival, Drouet (by then himself the city's postmaster) recognized the king, under the identity of a valet "Mr. Durand", from his portrait printed on an assignat in his possession, but did not take action immediately. The carriage left Sainte-Menehould around ten minutes later. Just after receiving the news of the king's escape sent from Paris by Lafayette, at around 9.p.m, Drouet set out to the nearby town of Varennes-en-Argonne, along with his friend Guillaume, in the direction he believed the berline had departed to.

Riding separately, with Drouet going through Clermont and Guillaume through the Forest of Argonne in Les Islettes, they arrived with their horses in Varennes just a few minutes after the royal family, and quickly notified the local authority of their presence in town. A bridge over the river Aire on the way to the frontier was then barricaded, and the National Guard, commanded by the future General Étienne Radet, was mobilized to assist in the blockade. The fugitives were finally detained at around 11:10.p.m, and arrested some time later after being formally identified as the royal family by Jacques Destez, a judge who had resided in Versailles.

== Later life and political career ==
=== National Convention ===
Drouet arrived at the capital on 24 June, and was invited by the Legislative Assembly to give his own account of the events in Varennes. The following month, the Legislative Assembly offered a reward of 30,000 livres for his service, which he declined, instead unsuccessfully requesting a post in the National Gendarmerie of his department of Marne, in November 1791. He was elected as a deputy from Marne to the National Convention in September 1792, where he sat with the radical Montagnards, and was later employed in the Committee of Public Safety.

In 1793 he voted for the death of Louis XVI without appeal, showed virulent opposition to the Girondins, and in July proposed the expulsion of all non-naturalized British speculators and stockjobbers residing in France. Sent as a representative on mission to the Army of the North in 1793, Drouet was captured by the Austrians during their siege of Maubeuge, and imprisoned at Spielberg Castle in Brno, Southern Moravia. In July 1794 he attempted to escape from one of the castle's windows but failed. He returned to France in December 1795, exchanged with other French revolutionaries and military officers for Marie Thérèse of France, daughter of Louis XVI.

=== Directory and beyond ===
Drouet then became a member of the Directory's Council of Five Hundred following the Thermidorian Reaction. In 1796 he was accused of involvement in Babeuf's Conspiracy of the Equals and imprisoned at the Prison de l'Abbaye, but shortly made his escape, going first to Switzerland and from there to the Canary Islands, where he took part in the successful resistance to Horatio Nelson's attack on Tenerife in 1797, and later visited India. He returned to France after being accquitted by the High Court.

In the First Empire, Drouet was appointed sub-préfet of Sainte-Menehould by Emperor Napoleon, and was made a member of the Legion of Honor on 7 August 1807. When bestowing Drouet with the order, Napoleon told him, "Mr. Drouet, you have changed the face of the world" (Monsieur Drouet, vous avez changé la face du monde). He served as deputy in the Chamber of Representatives during the Hundred Days, but with the Bourbon Restoration was exiled in January 1816, being deemed a perpetrator of regicide. He soon returned secretly, however, and settled in Mâcon under the name of "Merger", keeping his identity hidden until his death on 11 April 1824.
