= Siege of Maubeuge (1793) =

Siege of the War of the First Coalition

Coordinates: 50.2775°N 3.9734°E

- Part of the French Revolution
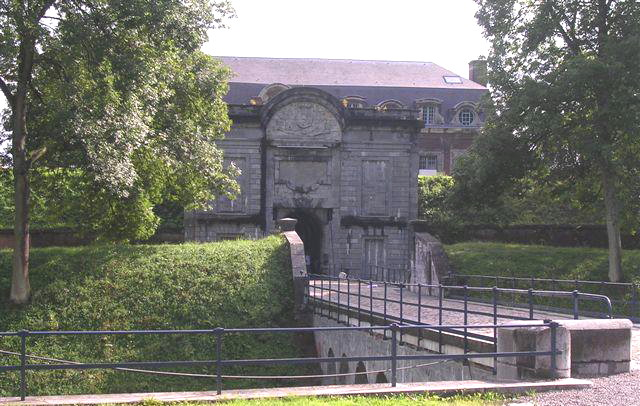
| Date | 30 September – 16 October 1793 |
| Location | Maubeuge, France |
| Result | French victory |

Belligerents
| Republican France | (Holy Roman Empire) Habsburg Austria; Dutch Republic |

Commanders and leaders
| (France) Jacques Ferrand; Jacques Desjardin | (Holy Roman Empire) Prince of Coburg (Dutch Republic) Prince of Orange |

Strength
| Garrison: 24,107; Relief Army: 45,000 | Siege Army: 26,000; Observation Army: 37,000 |

The siege of Maubeuge (30 September – 16 October 1793) was a siege of the city of Maubeuge by an Austro-Dutch force of 60,000 men under Prince Josias of Saxe-Coburg-Saalfeld during the War of the First Coalition. Maubeuge was defended by a 24,000-strong garrison under the French Republican generals Desjardin and Mayer. The Prince was aiming to clear his march on Paris, but he had to raise the siege after the Republican victory at the battle of Wattignies and the prospect of the armée de la Moselle coming to raise the siege.

The French representative on mission, Jean-Baptiste Drouet, was captured by the Austrians during the siege, and only returned to France in December 1795 through a prisoner exchange.

== Course ==
At the end of summer 1793, the Republican forces came to secure Dunkirk, but the situation on the northern frontier remained delicate. The strongholds of Condé, Quesnoy and Valenciennes were effectively in the hands of the First Coalition. The Austrian commander in chief laid siege to Maubeuge, to the east of the main theatre of war, to guarantee his line of advance towards Paris. The French generals defending it were experienced but short on supplies.

When he learned of the imminent arrival of the armée de la Moselle, the Prince left a major force of 33,000 men to continue the siege under the count of Clerfayt and moved to the Wattignies plateau to the south of Mauberge. After two days' fighting at Wattignies, the Prince ordered a general retreat on 16 October and raised the siege. After failing to take Maubeuge, the British and Austrian forces withdrew north and temporarily abandoned their plan to march on Paris.
