= List of battles of the War of the First Coalition =

This is a list of sieges, land and naval battles of the War of the First Coalition (20 April 1792 – 18 October 1797). It includes the battles of:

- the Low Countries theatre, or Flanders campaign (1792–1795);
- the Rhine campaigns (Valmy campaign August–September 1792, Mainz/Frankfurt October 1792, Rhine campaign of 1793–94, Rhine campaign of 1795, Rhine campaign of 1796);
- the April 1792 incursions into Switzerland;
- the Italian campaigns (April 1792 – October 1797);
- the Mediterranean campaign of 1793–1796;
- the War of the Pyrenees (March 1793 – July 1795);
- overseas naval or colonial battles (insofar these were not part of the Haitian Revolution or East Indies theatre); and
- insurrections in Paris that overtook or threatened to overtake the central government.

It does not include battles from the War in the Vendée (1793), nor the Chouannerie (1794–1800), nor the Haitian Revolution (1791–1804), nor the East Indies theatre of the French Revolutionary Wars (1793–1801), as these did not involve the First Coalition as such.

Date	Battle	Front	French forces	Coalition forces	Notes
28 April 1792	Capture of Porrentruy	Switzerland	Kingdom of the French	Habsburg Monarchy	French victory
28 April 1792	1st Battle of Quiévrain	Flanders	Kingdom of the French	Habsburg Monarchy	French victory
29 April 1792	Battle of Marquain	Flanders	Kingdom of the French	Habsburg Monarchy	Coalition victory
30 April 1792	2nd Battle of Quiévrain	Flanders	Kingdom of the French	Habsburg Monarchy	Coalition victory
23 June 1792	Battle of Harelbeke	Flanders	Kingdom of the French	Habsburg Monarchy	Coalition victory
10 August 1792	Insurrection of 10 August 1792 (Storming of the Tuileries)	Paris	French Republicans	French Royalists	Republican key victory King Louis XVI captured
19 – 23 August 1792	Capture of Longwy	Rhine	Kingdom of the French	Kingdom of Prussia	Coalition victory
24 August – 16 October 1792	Siege of Thionville (1792)	Rhine	Kingdom of the French	Habsburg Monarchy * Armée des émigrés	French victory
29 August 1792	Battle of Verdun (1792)	Rhine	Kingdom of the French	Kingdom of Prussia	Coalition victory
20 September 1792	Battle of Valmy	Rhine	Kingdom of the French	Habsburg Monarchy; Kingdom of Prussia • Armée des émigrés	French strategic victory Republic proclaimed
25 September – 8 October 1792	Siege of Lille (1792)	Flanders	French First Republic * Belgian exiles	Habsburg Monarchy	French victory
28 September 1792	Capture of Nice	Italy	French First Republic	Kingdom of Sardinia	French victory
18 – 21 October 1792	Siege of Mainz (1792)	Rhine	French First Republic	Electorate of Mainz	French victory
22 October 1792	Recapture of Longwy	Rhine	French First Republic	Kingdom of Prussia	French victory
23 October 1792	Battle of Frankfurt (1792)	Rhine	French First Republic	Free City of Frankfurt	French pyrrhic victory
6 November 1792	Battle of Jemappes	Flanders	French First Republic	Habsburg Monarchy	French key victory
9 November 1792	Battle of Limburg (1792)	Rhine	French First Republic	Kingdom of Prussia	French victory
13 November 1792	Battle of Anderlecht	Flanders	French First Republic	Habsburg Monarchy	French victory
21 November – 1 December 1792	Siege of Namur (1792)	Flanders	French First Republic	Habsburg Monarchy	French victory
21 December 1792 – 25 May 1793	French expedition to Sardinia	Mediterranean	French First Republic	Kingdom of Sardinia; Kingdom of Spain	Coalition victory (21 Jan: Louis XVI executed)
6 February – 2 March 1793	Siege of Maastricht (1793)	Flanders	French First Republic	Dutch Republic * Armée des émigrés Habsburg Monarchy; Kingdom of Prussia	Coalition victory
21 – 27 February 1793	Siege of Breda (1793)	Flanders	French First Republic	Dutch Republic	French pyrrhic victory
1 March 1793	Battle of Aldenhoven (1793)	Flanders	French First Republic	Habsburg Monarchy	Coalition key victory
18 March 1793	Battle of Neerwinden (1793)	Flanders	French First Republic	Habsburg Monarchy; Dutch Republic	Coalition key victory
8 April – 12 July 1793	Siege of Condé (1793)	Flanders	French First Republic	Habsburg Monarchy * Armée des émigrés	Coalition victory
14 April – 23 July 1793	Siege of Mainz (1793)	Rhine	French First Republic	Kingdom of Prussia; Habsburg Monarchy; Electorate of Saxony; Hesse-Kassel; Hesse-Darmstadt; Electoral Palatinate; Saxe-Weimar	Coalition victory
8 May 1793	Battle of Raismes (1793)	Flanders	French First Republic	Habsburg Monarchy; Great Britain; Kingdom of Prussia	Coalition victory
17 – 19 May 1793	Battle of Mas Deu	Pyrenees	French First Republic	Kingdom of Spain	Coalition victory
23 May 1793	Battle of Famars	Flanders	French First Republic	Habsburg Monarchy; Great Britain; Electorate of Hanover	Coalition victory
23 May – 24 June 1793	Siege of Bellegarde (1793)	Pyrenees	French First Republic	Kingdom of Spain * Armée des émigrés	Coalition victory
8 – 12 June 1793	Battle of Saorgio (1793)	Italy	French First Republic	Habsburg Monarchy; Kingdom of Sardinia	Coalition victory
9 June 1793	Battle of Arlon (1793)	Flanders	French First Republic	Habsburg Monarchy	French victory
13 June – 28 July 1793	Siege of Valenciennes (1793)	Flanders	French First Republic	Habsburg Monarchy; Great Britain; Electorate of Hanover	Coalition victory
17 July 1793	Battle of Perpignan (Battle of Niel)	Pyrenees	French First Republic	Kingdom of Spain	French victory
7 August 1793	Battle of Caesar's Camp	Flanders	French First Republic	Habsburg Monarchy; Great Britain; Electorate of Hanover	Coalition victory
17 August 1793	Battle of Lincelles	Flanders	French First Republic	Great Britain; Dutch Republic	Coalition victory
20 August – 23 December 1793	Siege of Landau (1793)	Rhine	French First Republic	Kingdom of Prussia	French victory
24 August – 8 September 1793	Siege of Dunkirk (1793)	Flanders	French First Republic	Habsburg Monarchy; Great Britain; Electorate of Hanover; Hesse-Kassel	French victory
28 August – 13 September 1793	Siege of Le Quesnoy (1793)	Flanders	French First Republic	Habsburg Monarchy * Armée des émigrés	Coalition victory
29 August – 19 December 1793	Siege of Toulon	Mediterranean	French First Republic	Great Britain * French Royalists; Kingdom of Spain; Kingdom of Naples; Kingdom of Sardinia	French victory
6 – 8 September 1793	Battle of Hondschoote	Flanders	French First Republic	Great Britain; Electorate of Hanover; Hesse-Kassel	French victory
12 September 1793	Battle of Avesnes-le-Sec	Flanders	French First Republic	Habsburg Monarchy	Coalition victory
12 – 13 September 1793	Battle of Menin (1793) (Battle of Wervik)	Flanders	French First Republic	Habsburg Monarchy; Dutch Republic	French victory
13 September 1793	Battle of Méribel	Italy	French First Republic	Kingdom of Sardinia	French victory
14 September 1793	Battle of Pirmasens	Rhine	French First Republic	Kingdom of Prussia	Coalition victory
15 September 1793	Battle of Courtrai (1793)	Flanders	French First Republic	Habsburg Monarchy; Great Britain	Coalition victory
15 September 1793	Battle of Epierre	Italy	French First Republic	Kingdom of Sardinia	French victory
17 September 1793	Battle of Peyrestortes	Pyrenees	French First Republic	Kingdom of Spain	French victory
30 September – 16 October 1793	Siege of Maubeuge (1793)	Flanders	French First Republic	Habsburg Monarchy; Dutch Republic	French victory
3 October 1793	Battle of Bergzabern	Rhine	French First Republic	Kingdom of Prussia * Armée des émigrés	Coalition victory
13 October 1793	First Battle of Wissembourg (1793)	Rhine	French First Republic	Habsburg Monarchy; Hesse-Kassel * Armée des émigrés	Coalition victory
14 October – 14 November 1793	Siege of Fort-Louis (1793)	Rhine	French First Republic	Habsburg Monarchy; Hesse-Darmstadt; Electorate of Bavaria	Coalition victory
15 – 16 October 1793	Battle of Wattignies	Flanders	French First Republic	Habsburg Monarchy; Dutch Republic	French victory
17 November 1793	Battle of Biesingen	Rhine	French First Republic	Kingdom of Prussia	Coalition victory
18 November – 22 December 1793	Battle of Haguenau (1793)	Rhine	French First Republic	Habsburg Monarchy * Armée des émigrés Hesse-Kassel; Electorate of Bavaria	French victory
28 – 30 November 1793	Battle of Kaiserslautern	Rhine	French First Republic	Kingdom of Prussia; Electorate of Saxony	Coalition victory
18 – 22 December 1793	Battle of Froeschwiller (1793)	Rhine	French First Republic	Habsburg Monarchy	French victory
20 – 23 December 1793	Battle of Collioure	Pyrenees	French First Republic	Kingdom of Spain	French victory
26 – 29 December 1793	Second Battle of Wissembourg (1793)	Rhine	French First Republic	Habsburg Monarchy; Kingdom of Prussia; Electorate of Bavaria; Hesse-Kassel	French strategic victory
5 February 1794	Battle of Sans Culottes Camp	Pyrenees	French First Republic	Bourbon Spain	French victory
5 February – 24 March 1794	Battle of Martinique (1794)	Overseas	French First Republic	Great Britain	Coalition victory
7 February – 10 August 1794	Invasion of Corsica (1794)	Mediterranean; Corsica	French First Republic	Great Britain * with Anglo-Corsican Kingdom	Coalition victory
7 – 20 February 1794	Siege of San Fiorenzo	Mediterranean; Corsica	French First Republic	Great Britain	Coalition victory
29 March 1794	Battle of Le Cateau (1794)	Flanders	French First Republic	Habsburg Monarchy	Coalition victory
4 April – 22 May 1794	Siege of Bastia	Mediterranean; Corsica	French First Republic	Great Britain	Coalition victory
11 April – 10 December 1794	Invasion of Guadeloupe (1794)	Overseas	French First Republic	Great Britain	French victory
17 – 18 April 1794	Battle of Arlon (1794)	Flanders	French First Republic	Habsburg Monarchy	French victory
17 – 30 April 1794	Siege of Landrecies (1794)	Flanders	French First Republic	Habsburg Monarchy; Dutch Republic	Coalition pyrrhic victory
24 April 1794	Battle of Villers-en-Cauchies	Flanders	French First Republic	Habsburg Monarchy; Great Britain	Coalition victory
24 – 28 April 1794	Battle of Saorgio	Italy	French First Republic	Habsburg Monarchy; Kingdom of Sardinia	French victory
26 April 1794	Battle of Beaumont (1794)	Flanders	French First Republic	Habsburg Monarchy; Great Britain	Coalition victory
26 – 30 April 1794	Battle of Mouscron	Flanders	French First Republic	Habsburg Monarchy; Electorate of Hanover * Armée des émigrés Hesse-Kassel	French victory
2 May – 1 June 1794	Atlantic campaign of May 1794	Overseas; Atlantic	French First Republic	Great Britain	French victory
6 – 29 May 1794	Siege of Collioure (1794)	Pyrenees	French First Republic	Kingdom of Spain	French victory
10 – 12 May 1794	Battle of Courtrai (1794)	Flanders	French First Republic	Habsburg Monarchy; Great Britain; Electorate of Hanover; Hesse-Darmstadt	French victory
13 May 1794	Battle of Grandreng (Battle of Rouvroi)	Flanders	French First Republic	Habsburg Monarchy; Dutch Republic	Coalition victory
18 May 1794	Battle of Tourcoing	Flanders	French First Republic	Habsburg Monarchy; Great Britain; Electorate of Hanover	French victory
20 – 24 May 1794	Battle of Erquelinnes (Battle of Péchant)	Flanders	French First Republic	Habsburg Monarchy; Dutch Republic	Coalition victory
22 May 1794	Battle of Tournay (1794)	Flanders	French First Republic	Habsburg Monarchy; Great Britain; Electorate of Hanover	Coalition victory
23 May 1794	Battle of Kaiserslautern (1794)	Rhine	French First Republic	Kingdom of Prussia; Electorate of Saxony; Habsburg Monarchy; Electorate of Bavaria	Coalition victory
30 May – 3 June 1794	Battle of Gosselies (Battle of Charleroi)	Flanders	French First Republic	Habsburg Monarchy; Dutch Republic	Coalition victory
1 June 1794	Glorious First of June (Combat de Prairial)	Overseas; Atlantic	French First Republic	Great Britain	Coalition tactical victory French strategic victory
1 – 18 June 1794	Siege of Ypres (1794)	Flanders	French First Republic	Habsburg Monarchy; Hesse-Kassel; Electorate of Hanover	French victory
12 – 16 June 1794	Battle of Lambusart	Flanders	French First Republic	Habsburg Monarchy; Dutch Republic	Coalition victory
17 June – 10 August 1794	Siege of Calvi	Mediterranean; Corsica	French First Republic	Great Britain with Anglo-Corsican Kingdom	Coalition victory
19 – 25 June 1794	Third siege of Charleroi	Flanders	French First Republic	Habsburg Monarchy	French tactical victory
26 June 1794	Battle of Fleurus (1794)	Flanders	French First Republic	Habsburg Monarchy; Dutch Republic; Electorate of Hanover; Great Britain	French decisive victory
13 – 17 July 1794	Battle of Trippstadt	Rhine	French First Republic	Habsburg Monarchy; Kingdom of Prussia	French victory
17 July 1794	Recapture of Landrecies	Flanders	French First Republic	Habsburg Monarchy	French victory
14 – 15 September 1794	Battle of Boxtel	Flanders	French First Republic	Great Britain; Hesse-Kassel; Hesse-Darmstadt	French victory
17 – 18 September 1794	Battle of Sprimont (Battle of the Ourthe)	Flanders	French First Republic	Habsburg Monarchy	French victory
21 September 1794	First Battle of Dego	Italy	French First Republic	Habsburg Monarchy; Kingdom of Sardinia	French victory
2 October 1794	Battle of Aldenhoven (1794) (Battle of the Roer)	Flanders	French First Republic	Habsburg Monarchy	French victory
19 October 1794	Battle of Puiflijk	Flanders	French First Republic	Great Britain * Armée des émigrés	French victory
27 October – 8 November 1794	Siege of Nijmegen (1794)	Flanders	French First Republic	Dutch Republic; Great Britain; Electorate of Hanover; Hesse-Kassel	French victory
22 November 1794 – 7 June 1795	Siege of Luxembourg (1794–95)	Flanders	French First Republic	Habsburg Monarchy	French key victory End Flanders campaign
24 January 1795	Capture of the Dutch fleet at Den Helder	Flanders	French First Republic; Batavian Republic	Dutch Republic	French victory
14 February 1795	Action of 14 February 1795	Mediterranean; Pyrenees	French First Republic	Kingdom of Spain	Coalition victory
14 March 1795	Battle of Genoa (1795) (Battle of Cape Noli)	Italy	French First Republic	Great Britain; Kingdom of Naples	Coalition victory
April 1795 – January 1796	Rhine campaign of 1795	Rhine 1795	French First Republic	Habsburg Monarchy	Coalition victory
23 June 1795	Battle of Groix	Overseas	French First Republic	Great Britain	Coalition victory
23 June – 21 July 1795	Invasion of France (1795) (Battle of Quiberon)	Overseas	French First Republic	Great Britain * French Royalists	French victory
13 July 1795	Battle of the Hyères Islands	Mediterranean	French First Republic	Great Britain; Kingdom of Naples	Coalition victory
22 August 1795	Action of 22 August 1795	Overseas	Batavian Republic	Great Britain	Coalition victory
24 September 1795	Battle of Handschuhsheim	Rhine 1795	French First Republic	Habsburg Monarchy	Coalition victory
5 October 1795	13 Vendémiaire	Paris	(French First Republic) French Republicans	French Royalists	Republican key victory
7 October 1795	Battle of the Levant Convoy	Mediterranean	French First Republic	Great Britain	French victory
11 – 12 October 1795	Battle of Höchst (1795)	Rhine 1795	French First Republic	Habsburg Monarchy	Coalition victory
18 October 1795	Battle of Mannheim (1795)	Rhine 1795	French First Republic	Habsburg Monarchy	Coalition victory
18 October – 22 November 1795	Siege of Mannheim (1795)	Rhine 1795	French First Republic	Habsburg Monarchy	Coalition victory
29 October 1795	Battle of Mainz	Rhine 1795	French First Republic	Habsburg Monarchy	Coalition victory
10 November 1795	Battle of Pfeddersheim (1795) (Battle of the Pfrimm)	Rhine 1795	French First Republic	Habsburg Monarchy	Coalition victory
23 – 24 November 1795	Battle of Loano	Italy	French First Republic	Habsburg Monarchy; Kingdom of Sardinia	French victory
10 – 28 April 1796	Montenotte campaign	Italy; Montenotte	French First Republic	Habsburg Monarchy; Kingdom of Sardinia	French key victory Sardinia sues for peace
10 April 1796	Battle of Voltri	Italy; Montenotte	French First Republic	Habsburg Monarchy	Coalition victory
10 – 11 April 1796	Battle of Montenotte	Italy; Montenotte	French First Republic	Habsburg Monarchy; Kingdom of Sardinia	French victory
13 – 14 April 1796	Battle of Millesimo	Italy; Montenotte	French First Republic	Habsburg Monarchy; Kingdom of Sardinia	French victory
14 – 15 April 1796	Second Battle of Dego	Italy; Montenotte	French First Republic	Habsburg Monarchy; Kingdom of Sardinia	French victory
16 April 1796	Battle of Ceva	Italy; Montenotte	French First Republic	Kingdom of Sardinia	French victory
21 April 1796	Battle of Mondovì	Italy; Montenotte	French First Republic	Kingdom of Sardinia	French victory
7 – 9 May 1796	Battle of Fombio	Italy	French First Republic	Habsburg Monarchy	French victory
10 May 1796	Battle of Lodi	Italy	French First Republic	Habsburg Monarchy	French victory
12 May 1796	Action of 12 May 1796	Overseas	Batavian Republic	Great Britain	Coalition victory
30 May 1796	Battle of Borghetto	Italy	French First Republic	Habsburg Monarchy	French victory
1 June – 21 July 1796	Early clashes in the Rhine campaign of 1796	Rhine 1796; Early clashes	French First Republic	Habsburg Monarchy	French victory
1 June 1796	Battle of Siegburg	Rhine 1796; Early clashes	French First Republic	Habsburg Monarchy	French victory
4 June 1796	Battle of Altenkirchen	Rhine 1796; Early clashes	French First Republic	Habsburg Monarchy	French victory
15 June 1796	Battle of Maudach	Rhine 1796; Early clashes	French First Republic	Habsburg Monarchy	French victory
15 June 1796	Battle of Wetzlar (1796)	Rhine 1796; Early clashes	French First Republic	Habsburg Monarchy	Coalition victory
23 – 24 June 1796	Battle of Kehl (1796)	Rhine 1796; Early clashes	French First Republic	Habsburg Monarchy	French victory
4 July 1796 – 2 February 1797	Siege of Mantua (1796–97)	Italy	French First Republic	Habsburg Monarchy	French victory
5 July 1796	Battle of Rastatt (1796)	Rhine 1796	French First Republic	Habsburg Monarchy	French victory
3 – 4 August 1796	Battle of Lonato	Italy	French First Republic	Habsburg Monarchy	French victory
5 August 1796	Battle of Castiglione	Italy	French First Republic	Habsburg Monarchy	French victory
6 August 1796	Battle of Peschiera	Italy	French First Republic	Habsburg Monarchy	French victory
24 August 1796	Battle of Friedberg (Bavaria)	Rhine 1796	French First Republic	Kingdom of Prussia	French victory
28 August – 5 September 1796	Newfoundland expedition	Overseas	French First Republic; Kingdom of Spain	Great Britain with its Newfoundland Colony	French victory
3 September 1796	Battle of Würzburg	Rhine 1796	French First Republic	Habsburg Monarchy	Coalition decisive victory
4 September 1796	Battle of Rovereto	Italy	French First Republic	Habsburg Monarchy	French victory
8 September 1796	Battle of Bassano	Italy	French First Republic	Habsburg Monarchy	French victory
14 – 15 September 1796	Battle of San Giorgio	Italy	French First Republic	Habsburg Monarchy	French victory
16 – 19 September 1796	Battle of Limburg (1796) (2nd Battle of Altenkirchen / Battle of the Lahn)	Rhine 1796	French First Republic	Habsburg Monarchy	Coalition victory
18 September 1796	Second Battle of Kehl (1796)	Rhine 1796	French First Republic	Habsburg Monarchy	Stalemate
2 October 1796	Battle of Biberach (1796)	Rhine 1796	French First Republic	Habsburg Monarchy	French victory
19 October 1796	Battle of Emmendingen	Rhine 1796	French First Republic	Habsburg Monarchy	Coalition victory
19 – 22 October 1796	French reconquest of Corsica (1796)	Mediterranean	French First Republic	Great Britain with Anglo-Corsican Kingdom	French victory
24 October 1796	Battle of Schliengen	Rhine 1796	French First Republic	Habsburg Monarchy	Coalition victory
26 October 1796 – 9 January 1797	Siege of Kehl (1796–97)	Rhine 1796	French First Republic	Habsburg Monarchy	Coalition victory
6 November 1796	Second Battle of Bassano	Italy	French First Republic	Habsburg Monarchy	Coalition victory
6 – 7 November 1796	Battle of Calliano	Italy	French First Republic	Habsburg Monarchy	Coalition victory
12 November 1796	Battle of Caldiero (1796)	Italy	French First Republic	Habsburg Monarchy	Coalition victory
15 – 17 November 1796	Battle of Arcole	Italy	French First Republic	Habsburg Monarchy	French victory
27 November 1796 – 1 February 1797	Siege of Hüningen (1796–97)	Rhine 1796	French First Republic	Habsburg Monarchy	Coalition victory
December 1796	French expedition to Ireland (1796)	Overseas	French First Republic * United Irishmen	Great Britain	Coalition victory
14 – 15 January 1797	Battle of Rivoli	Italy	French First Republic	Habsburg Monarchy	French decisive victory
15 – 16 January 1797	Battle of La Favorita	Italy	French First Republic	Habsburg Monarchy	French victory
3 or 4 February 1797	Battle of Faenza	Italy	French First Republic	Papal States	French victory
22 – 24 February 1797	Battle of Fishguard	Britain	French First Republic	Great Britain	Coalition victory
16 March 1797	Battle of Tagliamento	Italy	French First Republic	Habsburg Monarchy	French victory
16 March 1797	Battle of Valvasone (1797)	Italy	French First Republic	Habsburg Monarchy	French victory
20 March 1797	Expedition in Tyrol	Italy	French First Republic	Habsburg Monarchy	French victory
21 – 23 March 1797	Battle of Tarvis (1797)	Italy	French First Republic	Habsburg Monarchy	French victory
17 – 25 April 1797	Veronese Easter	Italy	French First Republic	Veronese rebels	French victory Fall of Venice
18 April 1797	Battle of Neuwied (1797)	Rhine	French First Republic	Habsburg Monarchy	French victory
20 – 21 April 1797	Battle of Diersheim (1797)	Rhine	French First Republic	Habsburg Monarchy	French victory
11 October 1797	Battle of Camperdown	Overseas	Batavian Republic	Great Britain	Coalition decisive victory

== See also ==
- List of battles of the War of the Second Coalition (1798/9 – 1801/2)
- List of battles of the War of the Third Coalition (1803/1805–1805/1806)
- List of battles of the War of the Fourth Coalition (9 October 1806 – 9 July 1807)
- List of battles of the War of the Fifth Coalition (10 April – 14 October 1809)
- List of battles of the War of the Sixth Coalition (3 March 1813 – 30 May 1814)
- List of battles of the Hundred Days (War of the Seventh Coalition) (15/20 March – 8 July / 16 August 1815)

== Bibliography ==
- Smith, Digby (1998). The Greenhill Napoleonic Wars Data Book: Actions and Losses in Personnel, Colours, Standards and Artillery, 1792–1815. Mechanicsburg, Pennsylvania: Stackpole Books. ISBN 1-85367-276-9.
- Dupuis, Victor César Eugène (1907). Les opérations militaires sur la Sambre en 1794: Bataille de Fleurus (in French). Paris: R Chapelot et Cie.
