= Antoine Gentili =

French-Corsican general

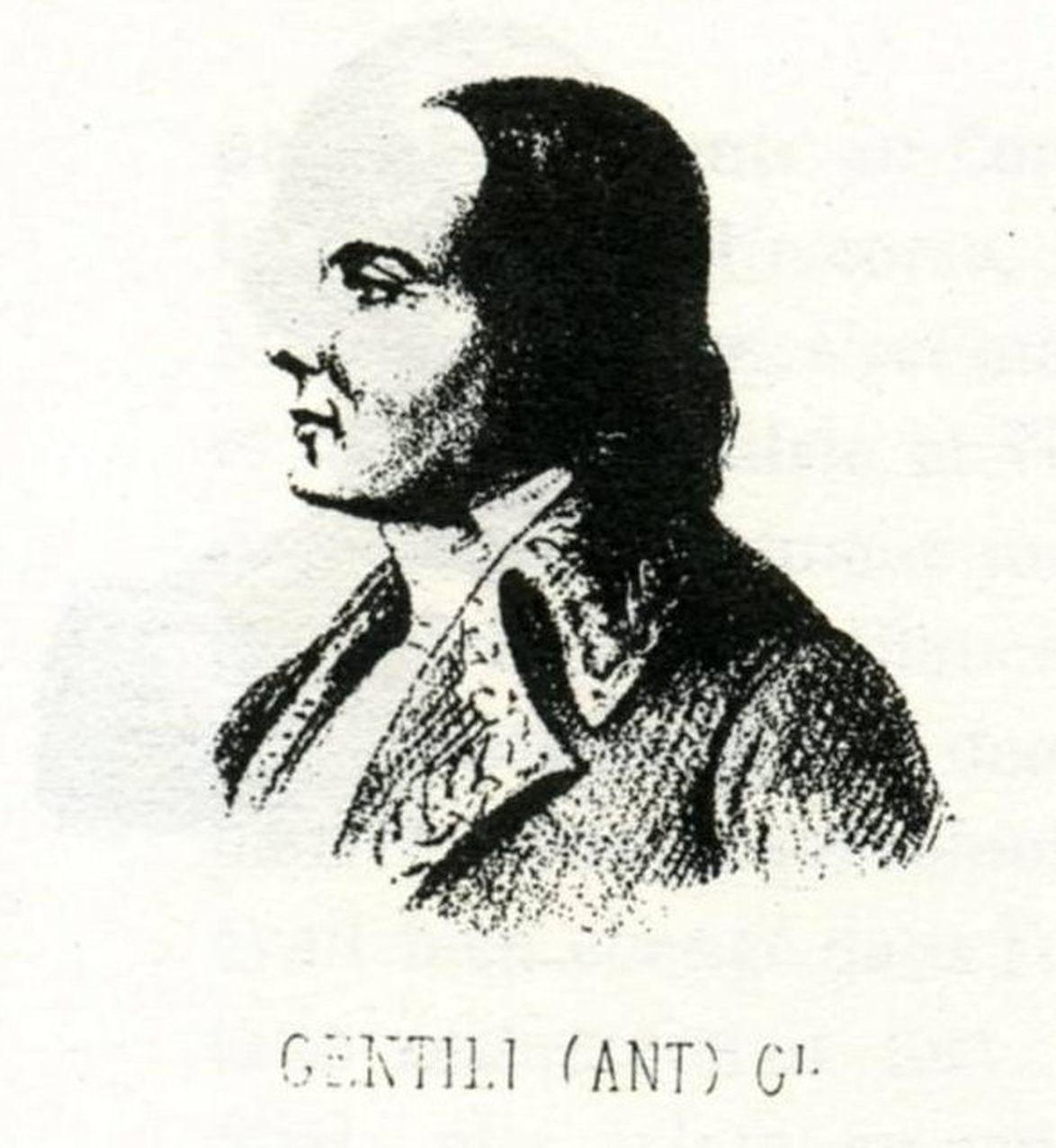
1799 portrait of Gentili

Antoine Gentili (1743 or 1751 – 1798) was a French-Corsican general. A supporter of Pascal Paoli, he fought against the Republic of Genoa. After the French Revolution he sided with the new French Republic, but was defeated and surrendered to the British after their 1794 Invasion of Corsica. After that he fought as a général de division in the French Army of Italy, leading the recapture of Corsica in 1796. In 1797 he was appointed as the first governor of the Ionian Islands under French rule in 1797. He retired on grounds of ill health soon after, dying on 27 March 1798.

== Sources ==
- Berthelot, André; Hartwig; Derenbourg (1885–1902). "Gentili (Antoine)". La Grande Encyclopédie. Inventaire raisonné des sciences, des lettres et des arts (in French). Vol. 18. Paris: H. Lamirault.
- de Courcelles, Jean Baptiste Pierre Jullien (1823). "Gentile (Antoine)". In Arthus-Bertrand (ed.). Dictionnaire historique et biographique des généraux français, depuis le onzième siècle jusqu'en 1820 (in French). Vol. 9. Paris. p. 508.
- Beauvais de Préau, Charles Théodore; Barbier, Antoine-Alexandre (1829). "Gentili". In Charles Gosselin (ed.). Biographie universelle classique, ou Dictionnaire historique portatif (in French). Vol. 1. Paris. p. 1126.
- Chaudon, Louis-Maïeul; Delandine, Antoine-François; Mercier de Saint-Léger, Barthélemy (1810). "Gentily". In Mame (ed.). Dictionnaire universel, historique, critique et bibliographique (in French). Vol. 7 (9 ed.). Paris. p. 374.
- Las Cases, Emmanuel de (1951). Le Mémorial de Sainte-Hélène (in French). Vol. 1. Flammarion. p. 883.
- Ours-Jean Caporossi. "Chronique de la Corse - Répertoire des personnages" (in French). and Ours-Jean Caporossi. "Chronique de la Corse - Le XVIIIe siècle".
- Jean-Noël Poiron (2009). "Les généraux corses de la Révolution et du Premier Empire" (in French).
- Tradition. Hors série Les généraux de Napoléon, volume 1 - Alain Pigeard. Coll de J.-N. Poiron
- Six, Georges (1934). "Gentilli (Antoine)". Dictionnaire biographique des généraux et amiraux français de la Révolution et de l'Empire: 1792–1814 (in French). Vol. 1. Paris: Librairie Historique et Nobilaire. p. 496.
- Dictionnaire Encyclopédique D’Histoire. Larousse-Bordas. Coll de J.-N. Poiron
