= Esprit de corps (disambiguation) =

Esprit de corps is a French phrase roughly meaning unit cohesion or morale.

Esprit de corps may also refer to:

- Esprit de Corps (magazine), a Canadian military magazine
- Esprit de Corps, a 2005 EP by Wild Beasts
- "Esprit de Corps" (The Avengers), an episode of the British spy-fi television series The Avengers
- Esprit de Corps, a 2014 Philippine film by Kanakan Balintagos
- "Esprit de Corps", one of the 24 skills in the video game Disco Elysium
- "Uniforms (Corp D'Esprit)", a song by Pete Townshend from his 1982 album All the Best Cowboys Have Chinese Eyes

== See also ==
- Esprit (disambiguation)
