= Esprit =

Esprit or L'Esprit may refer to:

- the French word for spirit; as a loanword:
  - Enthusiasm, intense interest or motivation
  - Morale, motivation and readiness
  - Geist "mind/spirit; intellect"
- Esprit (name), a given name and surname
- Esprit (magazine), a periodical
- L'esprit, a 1990 album by In the Nursery
- Lotus Esprit, a car
- Esprit Holdings, a clothing manufacturer
- Esprit D'Air, a Japanese metal band
- European Strategic Program on Research in Information Technology, a cooperative government program
- Estimation of signal parameters via rotational invariance techniques, a signal processing method
- European System Providing Refueling, Infrastructure and Telecommunications, a planned module of the Lunar Gateway
- Esprit Systems, defunct computer terminal manufacturer

== See also ==
- Espirit
