= ADI Corporation =

Defunct Taiwanese manufacturer

- Company type: Public
- Industry: Manufacturing
- Founded: March 1979; 46 years ago in Taiwan
- Founder: Liao Jian-cheng
- Products: Computer hardware; Footwear
- Divisions: ADI Systems; Quimax Systems

ADI Corporation (Advanced Data International) is a defunct Taiwanese manufacturing company active from 1979 to the 2000s. Its primary export was computer hardware—chiefly computer monitors—through its American subsidiary ADI Systems. For a time, it was the fifth largest monitor manufacturer in the world, with major customers including Apple, Compaq, and Optiquest.

== History ==
ADI Corporation (an initialism for Advanced Data International) was founded in Taiwan in March 1979 by Liao Jian-cheng. The company was originally a diversified concern, manufacturing a number of disparate products, including footwear for Nike, Inc. By the time the company entered the market for computer hardware in the 1980s, ADI still had a contract with Nike to produce shoes. Its first computer-related exports were data terminals and computer monitors.

In 1986, Liao Jian-cheng merged ADI with his other corporation Cheng Chang Enterprises Co., Ltd. In 1987, the company went public on the Taiwan Stock Exchange. Around the same time, the company established Quimax Systems, an American subsidiary dedicated to importing the company's monitors and terminals manufactured in Taiwan. A major customer of Quimax in the 1980s was Esprit Systems, a seller of terminals that was spun off from Hazeltine Corporation within the decade. In 1989, ADI became a major shareholder in Espirit, and in 1990 the year they led a group of other Taiwanese companies in a takeover of Espirit that transformed the public American company into a privately owned venture.

By the turn of the 1990s, ADI was a leading manufacturer of terminals and displays in Taiwan. ADI began offering monitors under their own name starting in 1993, under the subbrand MicroScan. Major customers of ADI soon included Apple Computer, Compaq, and Optiquest. Of these customers, Compaq was by far the largest, ADI producing nearly all of their monitors in the 1990s. In November 1994, Compaq, which was acquired by Hewlett-Packard in May 2002, formed a joint venture with ADI to raise factories in Mexico, Brazil, and Europe to assemble and store ADI's monitors, helping reduce the travel time from Taiwan to ADI's major exports. Unit shipments increased from 1.1 million in 1993 to 1.6 million in 1994. Also in 1994, ADI piloted the production of an i486SX subnotebook, although it never came to fruition.

In 1998, ADI obtained the rights from Sony to sell monitors with Trinitron picture tubes, starting with the MicroScan 5GT. Around the turn of the millennium, the company began selling flat-panel monitors, chiefly LCDs.

ADI went defunct around the same time they let their American website domain name expire in December 2006.
