= Espirit =

Espirit may refer to:

== Arts, entertainment, and media ==
- Espirit de Corps, a musical track from the Call of Duty: Modern Warfare 2 original soundtrack, composed by Hans Zimmer and Lorne Balfe

== Brands and companies ==
- Esprit Holdings, a manufacturer of clothing, accessories and housewares (often misspelled as "Espirit")
- Esprit Systems, a former American terminal and display manufacturer (sometimes referred to as "ESPIRIT SYSTEMS")

== See also ==
- Esprit
- Spirit (disambiguation)
