= Esprit (name) =

Esprit is a surname and given name.

== Surname ==
- Jacques Esprit (1611–1677), French moralist and writer

== Given name ==
- Esprit Barthet (1919–1999), Maltese artist
- Esprit Antoine Blanchard (1696–1770), French baroque composer
- Esprit Calvet (1728–1810), French physician and collector
- Esprit-Joseph Chaudon (1738–1800), French bibliographer and writer
- Esprit Fléchier (1632–1710), French preacher and author
- Esprit Jouffret (1837–1904), French officer and mathematician
- A winged unicorn in Dream a Little Dream

== See also ==
- Wandering Spirit (Cree leader), aka Esprit Errant
