= William Hotham, 1st Baron Hotham =

Royal Navy officer (1736–1813)

Admiral The Right Honourable The Lord Hotham
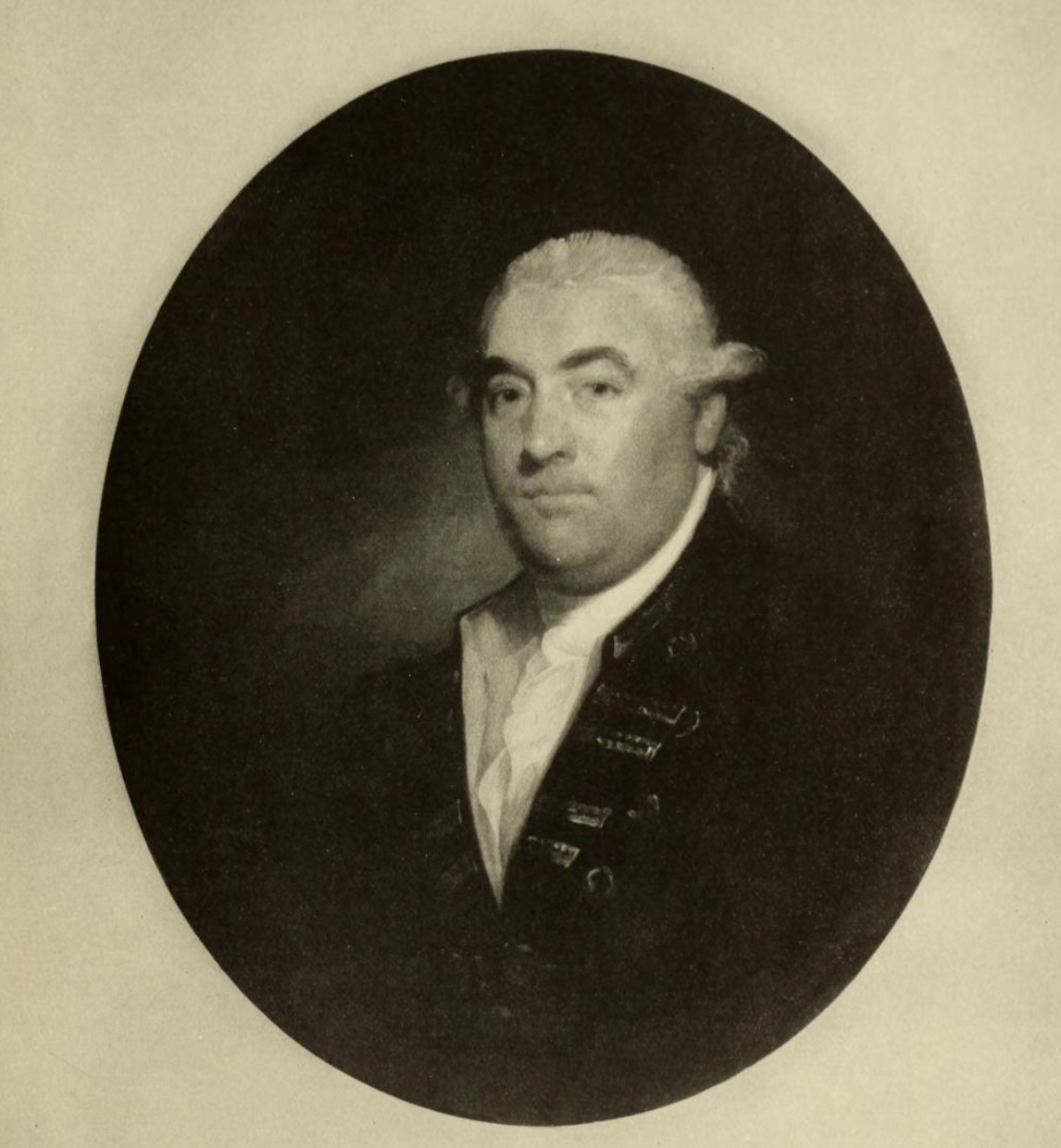
- Engraving after a portrait by Gilbert Stuart
- Born: 8 April 1736
- Died: 2 May 1813 (aged 77)
- Allegiance: Great Britain; United Kingdom
- Branch: Royal Navy
- Service years: 1751–1813
- Rank: Admiral of the White
- Commands: HMS Fortune; HMS Siren; HMS Gibraltar; HMS Squirrel; HMS Melampus; HMS Aeolus; HMS Hero; HMS Resolution; HMS Preston; HMS Vengeance; HMS Edgar; HMS Princess Royal; HMS Britannia; Mediterranean Fleet
- Conflicts: Seven Years' War; American War of Independence; New York and New Jersey campaign; Battle of St. Lucia; Battle of Martinique (1780); Battle of Cape Spartel; French Revolutionary Wars; Mediterranean campaign of 1793–1796; Battle of Genoa (1795); Battle of the Hyères Islands

Admiral of the White William Hotham, 1st Baron Hotham (8 April 1736 – 2 May 1813) was a Royal Navy officer who served in the Seven Years' War, American War of Independence and French Revolutionary Wars. He was the son of Sir Beaumont Hotham, 7th Baronet, a descendant of Sir John Hotham, 1st Baronet.

== Early life ==
William Hotham was born on 8 April 1736, the son of Sir Beaumont Hotham, 7th Baronet. He was educated at Westminster School in London and the Royal Naval Academy in Portsmouth. In 1751, Hotham joined the Royal Navy as a midshipman onboard HMS Gosport, which was then part of the North American Station. He subsequently served on HMS Advice in the West Indies and HMS Swan in North America. Passing his lieutenant's examination on 7 August 1754, Hotham was promoted to lieutenant on 28 January 1755 onboard Sir Edward Hawke's flagship HMS St George. Hotham followed Hawke onto HMS Namur, HMS Antelope and HMS Ramillies. Hawke subsequently placed Hotham in command of a 10-gun polacca, his first command.

== Seven Years' War ==
On 19 November 1756, during the Seven Years' War, Hotham was promoted to master and commander and made captain of HMS Fortune by Hawke. Hotham was subsequently placed in temporary command of HMS Siren and fought an inconclusive single-ship action with the 26-gun French frigate Télémaque. Commanding Fortune, Hotham captured a 26-gun French privateer, for which he was promoted to post-captain and made captain of HMS Gibraltar on 17 August 1757. In November 1757 he was made captain of HMS Squirrel and on 17 April 1758 transferred his captaincy to HMS Melampus, with which Hotham spent the next 12 months in the North Sea Station.

On 20 March 1759, Melampus and HMS Southampton encountered two French frigates and captured the frigate Danaé. Melampus was subsequently attached to a British fleet under Hawke, but mostly spent her time in the fleet as an independent cruiser, although she participated in the British capture of Belle Île between April and June 1761 as part of a squadron under Augustus Keppel. On 4 May 1761 Hotham transferred his captaincy to HMS Aeolus and continued to cruise against enemy privateers and merchantmen until the war ended in 1763. On 24 October 1766, Hotham was made captain of HMS Hero, which served as a guard ship at Plymouth until the spring of 1769 when she resupplied the British garrison on Minorca. On 1 November 1769 Hotham left Hero and became captain of HMS Resolution on 7 December 1770, commanding her as another Plymouth guard ship for exactly three years.

== American War of Independence ==
In April 1776, following the outbreak of the American War of Independence, Hotham was promoted to commodore and made captain of HMS Preston, joining the British fleet under Vice-Admiral of the Blue Richard Howe in the North American Station. On 8 December 1776, Preston was part of the British fleet which occupied Newport, Rhode Island. In 1777, Hotham became the seniormost British naval officer in New York City when Howe left to command the Philadelphia campaign, and made plans to secure passage of British ships in the Hudson River together with Major-general Sir Henry Clinton before these were scrapped following arrival of news of the British defeat at Saratoga. Remaining in New York, in July 1778 Hotham served under Howe in preparing to defend Sandy Hook against an expected attack by a French fleet under Vice-admiral Charles Henri Hector, Count of Estaing. However, on 12 August a storm scattered British and French warships in the area, and Preston proceeded to fight an inconclusive action with the 80-gun ship of the line Tonnant.

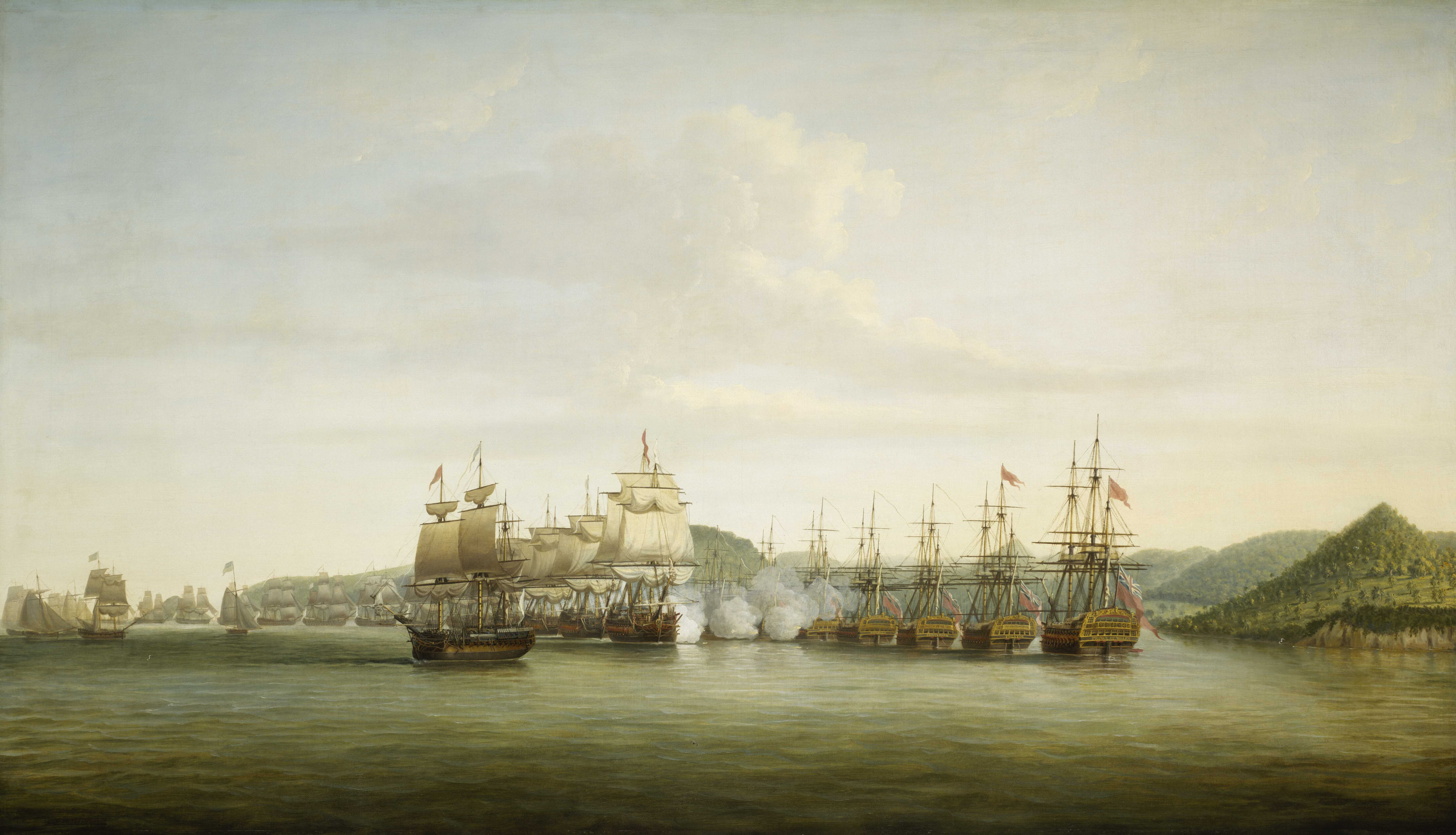
The Battle of St. Lucia, at which Hotham commanded HMS Preston

Following the action, Preston was sent to the West Indies to reinforce a British fleet commanded by Rear-Admiral of the Red Samuel Barrington, and fought under Barrington at the Battle of St. Lucia on 15 December 1778. Preston was stationed at the British colony of Barbados in the summer of 1779, and on 17 January 1780 Hotham transferred his captaincy to HMS Vengeance. Commanding Vengeance in a British fleet under Admiral of the White Sir George Rodney, Hotham fought in the Battle of Martinique on 17 April. Vengeance also fought in two further engagements under Rodney on 15 and 19 May. Rodney subsequently sailed to North America, leaving Hotham the seniormost British naval officer in the Leeward Islands. Between 10 and 12 October Vengeance was damaged as part of the Great Hurricane of 1780 and returned to England for repairs.

Returning to the West Indies following Vengeance's repairs being completed, in Spring 1781 Hotham was ordered to escort a convoy of 30 merchantmen from British-occupied Sint Eustatius to Britain. On 2 May, the convoy encountered a large French squadron under Toussaint-Guillaume Picquet de la Motte twenty leagues west of the Isles of Scilly. Hotham, who only commanded two ships of the line and three frigates, signalled the merchantmen to disperse and "make the best of their way independently", while ordering his warships to attack de la Motte's squadron. However, the French avoided Hotham's squadron and captured 22 of the British merchantmen; the remainder escaped into Castletownbere, where they were joined by Hotham and his squadron. On 17 August Hotham ceased being captain of Vengeance and on 1 May 1782 became captain of HMS Edgar, participating in the Battle of Cape Spartel on 20 October. Hotham ceased being captain of Edgar on 31 March 1783, the same year the war came to an end.

== French Revolutionary Wars ==
On 24 September 1787 Hotham was promoted to Rear-Admiral of the Red and was on active service during the 1790 Nootka Crisis, hoisting his flag on HMS Princess Royal on 16 May. Hotham was promoted again to Vice-Admiral of the Blue on 21 September 1790 and ceased being captain of Princess Royal on 9 September 1791. Following deteriorating Anglo-French relations Hotham was made captain of HMS Britannia in January 1793, and after Revolutionary France declared war on Britain on 1 February Hotham was promoted to Vice-Admiral of the White and sent to the Mediterranean as second-in-command of a British fleet under Vice-Admiral of the Red Lord Hood. Hotham served in the Mediterranean campaign of 1793–1796, being promoted to Vice-Admiral of the Red on 12 April 1794 and blockading the French warships in Golfe-Juan in autumn of that year. Following Hood being recalled to England in October 1794, Hotham became the Commander-in-Chief, Mediterranean Fleet, a position which was officially confirmed on 4 May 1795.

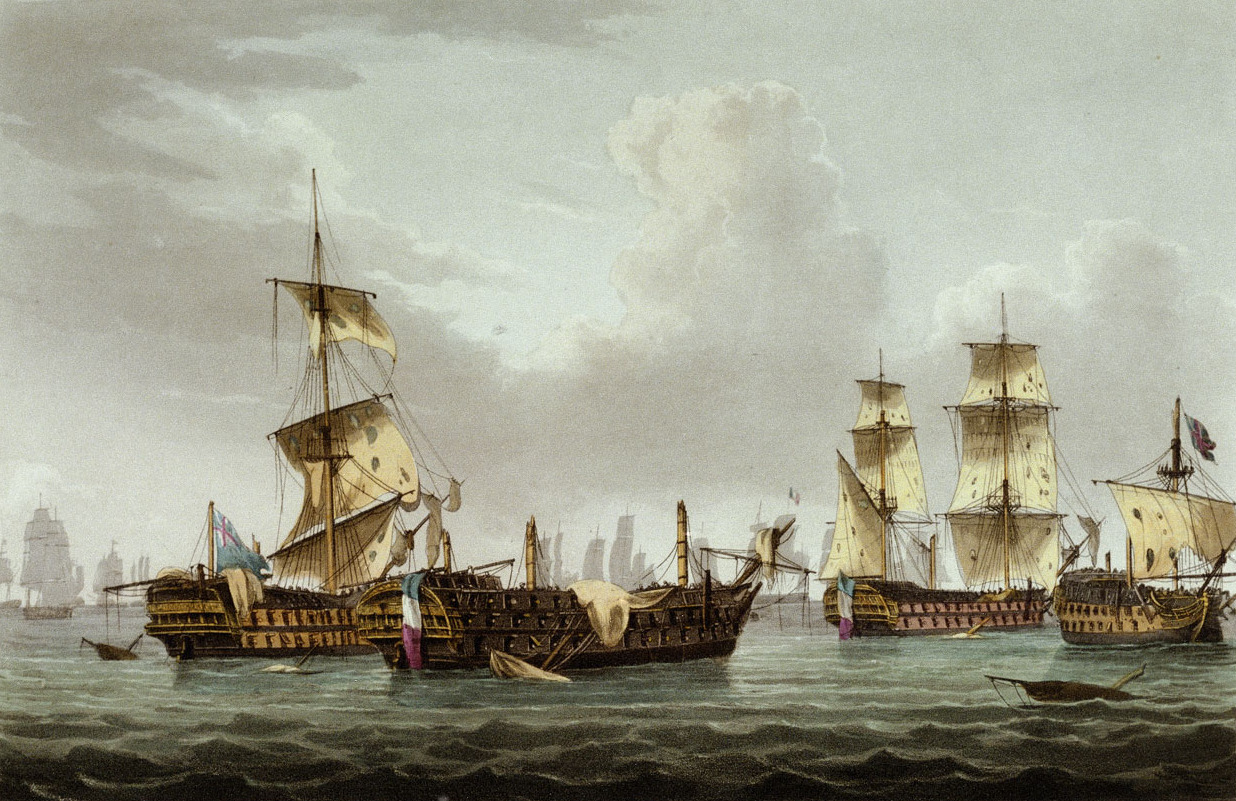
The Battle of Genoa, at which Hotham won a partial victory

In March 1795 Hotham was at Livorno when he learned that a French fleet under Counter-admiral Pierre Martin had put to sea under orders from the French Directory. Hotham put out to sea with his fleet and on 13 March the two fleets fought the Battle of Genoa. Martin, understanding the inferiority of his fleet, ordered it to avoid combat, and the British chased the French until 14 March, when Hotham's ships captured the ships of the line Ça Ira and Censeur. However, the rest of Martin's fleet was able to escape due to Hotham refusing to press home the action in spite of remonstrances from Captain Horatio Nelson, who had distinguished himself at the battle. Hotham wrote in his after action report to the British Admiralty that the French fleet was numerically equal or superior to his, and the partial victory led to Hotham and his fleet being thanked by both houses of Parliament.

On 13 July 1795 Hotham's fleet fought the Battle of the Hyères Islands against Martin's fleet under similar circumstances to the Battle of Genoa. The British managed to capture the French ship of the line Alcide, which subsequently blew up, but the rest of Martin's fleet escaped; Nelson described the battle as a "miserable action" in a letter to his brother. Hotham has been subsequently criticised by historians for failing to win a more decisive victory. In November 1795 Hotham was replaced as Commander-in-Chief, Mediterranean Fleet by Admiral of the Blue Sir John Jervis and returned to England, where on 7 March 1797 he was elevated to the peerage of Ireland as Baron Hotham.

== Later life and death ==
Hotham continued to serve in the Royal Navy but saw no further active service following his return to England from the Mediterranean. On 14 February 1799, Hotham was promoted to his final rank, Admiral of the White. On 18 July 1811, he succeeded to his nephew's baronetcy. Hotham died on 2 May 1813, and as he died unmarried his titles passed to his younger brother Beaumont. The 1885 edition of the Dictionary of National Biography described Hotham as

A good officer and a man of undaunted courage, he had on several occasions done admirably in a subordinate rank; but he was wanting in the energy, force of character, and decision requisite in a commander-in-chief. It does not appear to have been the intention of the admiralty that he should continue in that position.

Military offices
Preceded by The Viscount Hood	Commander-in-Chief, Mediterranean Fleet; October 1794–November 1795	Succeeded by The Earl of St Vincent
Peerage of Ireland
New creation	Baron Hotham; 1797–1813	Succeeded by Beaumont Hotham
Baronetage of England
Preceded by Charles Hotham	Baronet (of Scorborough); 1811–1813	Succeeded by Beaumont Hotham
