= Louis-Mayeul Chaudon =

French Benedictine biographer (1737–1817)

Louis-Mayeul Chaudon (20 May 1737, Valensole – 28 May 1817, Mézin), was a French Benedictine biographer.

== Life ==
After studying in the colleges of Marseille and Avignon, Chaudon decided to become an ecclesiastic, and was admitted to the order of Saint Benedict at Cluny. Here he had the use of a library. He received honorable briefs from Pope Clement XIII and Pope Pius VI for the works which he composed in defense of Catholicism.

The congregation of Cluny was suppressed in 1787. Chaudon took refuge in the village of Mézin. Old age was drawing on; his sight was failing, his health was feeble, but he secured the esteem of his new neighbors, who begged permission to place his portrait in the hall of the mairie. He lived through all the changes of the Revolution, for the last ten or twelve years blind and in much suffering, till his death, at age 80. He had collaborated on occasions with his brother Esprit-Joseph Chaudon, who was a bibliographer. He died at Mézin.

== Works ==
His earliest essays were poetical, but after the publication of an Ode sur la Calomnie, (1756), and another addressed to the Échevins de Marseille (1757), he perceived that his forte lay in history and biography.

He published in 1766 the Nouveau Dictionnaire Historique, a biographical dictionary in 4 vols., designed to be equally removed from the prolixity of Louis Moréri and the dryness of Jean-Baptiste Ladvocat, with the imprint of Amsterdam, and professing to be the production of a "société de gens de lettres," but which, in fact, proceeded exclusively from the pen of Chaudon, and was published at Paris. In the form it ultimately assumed, it formed the basis of most of the French biographical dictionaries that followed: the lives are brief, but essential facts and distinctive opinions are noted, for a handy book of reference. The best edition was the 8th, in 13 vols., Lyon, An xii. (1804), in which Chaudon, who had been for some time blind, was assisted by Antoine-François Delandine, who wrote the lives of the revolutionists, the two names being associated on the title page. In this edition, the 13th volume consists of chronological tables of ancient and modern history. The 9th and last edition, by Prudhomme, 20 vols. Paris, 1810–12, was full of errors, and comparatively worthless. It was the basis of the subsequent and distinct work of the François-Xavier de Feller.

Chaudon was also the author of:

- a pseudonymous Dictionnaire Historique des Auteurs Ecclésiastiques, avec le catalogue de leurs ouvrages, 4 vols. Lyon, 1767;
- a work directed against the Encyclopedists;
- Dictionnaire anti-philosophique, Pour servir de Commentaire & de Correctif au Dictionnaire Philosophique, & aux autres Livres, qui ont paru de nos jours contre le Christianisme, Avignon, 1767;
  - Anti-dictionnaire philosophique, Pour servir de Commentaire & de Correctrif au Dictionnaire Philosophique, & aux autres Livres qui ont paru de nos jours contre le Christianisme, vol. 1, vol. 2, 3° edition, Avignon, 1774;
  - Anti-dictionnaire philosophique, Pour servir de Commentaire & de Correctrif au Dictionnaire Philosophique, & aux autres Livres qui ont paru de nos jours contre le Christianisme, vol. 1, vol. 2, 4° edition, Paris, 1775;
- Chronologiste Manuel, 1766, etc.;
- Leçons d'Histoire et de Chronologie, 2 vols. Caen, 1785;
- Nouveau Manuel Épistolaire, Caen, 1785, 2 vols. Paris, 1786;
- Mémoires pour servir à l'Histoire de Voltaire, 2 vols. Amsterdam (Paris), 1785.

== Sources ==
- Charles Knight, Biography: or, Third division of "The English encyclopedia", London, Bradbury, Evans & Co., 1872, pp. 372–73.
