= Early clashes in the Rhine campaign of 1796 =

Action of the War of the First Coalition

In the Rhine Campaign of 1796 (June 1796 to February 1797), two First Coalition armies under the overall command of Archduke Charles outmaneuvered and defeated two Republican French armies. This was the last campaign of the War of the First Coalition, part of the French Revolutionary Wars.

The French military strategy against Austria rested on a three-pronged invasion to surround Vienna, ideally capturing the city and forcing the Holy Roman Emperor into a surrender and acceptance of French Revolutionary ideals. Toward this end, the French assembled three armies: Army of Sambre-et-Meuse commanded by Jean-Baptiste Jourdan faced the Austrian Army of the Lower Rhine in the north; the Army of Rhin-et-Moselle, led by Jean Victor Marie Moreau, confronted the Austrian Army of the Upper Rhine in the south; the Army of Italy approached Vienna through northern Italy.

Initially successes of the Army of Italy forced the Coalition commander, Archduke Charles, to transfer 25,000 men commanded by Dagobert Sigmund von Wurmser to northern Italy. This weakened the Coalition force along the 340 kilometers (211 mi) of the Rhine from Basel to the North Sea. A feint by Jourdan's Army of Sambre-et-Meuse convinced Charles to shift troops to the north, allowing Moreau to cross of the Rhine at Kehl on 24 June and beat the Archduke's Imperial contingents. Both French armies penetrated deeply into eastern and southern Germany by late July, forcing the southern states of the Holy Roman Empire into punitive armistices. By August, though, the French armies had extended their fronts too thinly and the competition and jealousies between and among the French generals complicated cooperation between the two armies. Because the two French armies operated independently, Archduke Charles was able to leave Maximilian Anton Karl, Count Baillet de Latour with a weaker army in front of Moreau on the southernmost flank, and move heavy reinforcements to help Wilhelm von Wartensleben's army in the north.

In battles at Amberg on 24 August and Würzburg on 3 September Charles defeated Jourdan and compelled the French army to retreat, eventually to the west bank of the Rhine. With Jourdan neutralized and retreating into France, Charles left Franz von Werneck to watch the Army of Sambre-et-Meuse, making sure it did not try to recover a foothold on the east bank of the Rhine, and turned on Moreau, who belatedly began to withdraw from southern Germany. Although Moreau briskly repulsed Latour at Biberach, he did not make it through the Black Forest before Charles was able to cut French access to the Bruchsal and Kehl crossings. In the battles of Emmendingen and Schliengen in October, Charles forced Moreau to retreat to the west bank of the Rhine. During the winter the Austrians reduced the French bridgeheads at Kehl and Huningue (Hüningen). Despite Charles' success in Germany, Austria was losing the war in Italy to a new French army commander, Napoleon Bonaparte.

== Background ==
Initially, the rulers of Europe viewed the French Revolution as a dispute between the French king and his subjects, and not something in which they should interfere. As revolutionary rhetoric grew more strident, they declared the interest of the monarchs of Europe as one with the interests of Louis XVI and his family; this Declaration of Pillnitz (27 August 1791) threatened ambiguous, but quite serious, consequences if anything should happen to the royal family. The position of the revolutionaries became increasingly difficult. Compounding their problems in international relations, French émigrés continued to agitate for support of a counter-revolution. Finally, on 20 April 1792, the French National Convention declared war on Austria. In this War of the First Coalition (1792–98), France ranged itself against most of the European states sharing land or water borders with her, plus Portugal and the Ottoman Empire. Despite some victories in 1792, by early 1793, France was in terrible crisis: French forces had been pushed out of Belgium; also there was revolt in the Vendée over conscription; widespread resentment of the Civil Constitution of the Clergy; and the French king had just been executed. The armies of the French Republic were in a state of disruption; the problems became even more acute following the introduction of mass conscription, the levée en masse, which saturated an already distressed army with thousands of illiterate, untrained men. For the French, the Rhine Campaign of 1795 proved especially disastrous, although they had achieved some success in other theaters of war (see for example, War of the Pyrenees (1793–95)).

The armies of the First Coalition included the imperial contingents and the infantry and cavalry of the various states, amounting to about 125,000 (including three autonomous corps), a sizable force by eighteenth century standards but a moderate force by the standards of the Revolutionary and Napoleonic wars. In total, the commander-in-chief Archduke Charles' troops stretched from Switzerland to the North Sea and Dagobert Sigmund von Wurmser's, from the Swiss-Italian border to the Adriatic. Habsburg troops comprised the bulk of the army, but the thin white line of Habsburg infantry could not cover the territory from Basel to Frankfurt with sufficient depth to resist the pressure of their opponents. (Note: Habsburg infantry wore white coats. Gunther E. Rothenberg, "The Habsburg Army in the Napoleonic Wars (1792–1815)". Military Affairs, 37:1 (Feb 1973), 1–5.) Compared to French coverage, Charles had half the number of troops covering a 340-kilometer (210 mi) front that stretched from Renchen near Basel to Bingen. Furthermore, he had concentrated the bulk of his force, commanded by Count Baillet Latour, between Karlsruhe and Darmstadt, where the confluence of the Rhine and the Main made an attack most likely; the rivers offered a gateway into eastern German states and ultimately to Vienna, with good bridges crossing a relatively well-defined river bank. To his north, Wilhelm von Wartensleben's autonomous corps (Note: An autonomous corps, in the Austrian or Imperial armies, was an armed force under command of an experienced field commander. They usually included two divisions, but probably not more than three, and function with high maneuverability and independent action, hence the name "autonomous corps." Some, called the Frei-Corps, or independent corps, were used as light infantry before the official formation of light infantry in the Habsburg Army in 1798. They provided the Army's skirmishing and scouting function; Frei-Corps were usually raised from the provinces. See Philip Haythornthwaite, Austrian Army of the Napoleonic Wars (1): Infantry. Osprey Publishing, 2012, p. 24. Military historians usually maintain that Napoleon solidified the use of the autonomous corps, armies that could function without a great deal of direction, scatter about the countryside, but reform again quickly for battle; this was actually a development that first emerged first in the French and Indian War in the Thirteen British Colonies and later in the American Revolutionary War, and became widely used in the European military as the size of armies grew in the 1790s and during the Napoleonic Wars. See David Gates, The Napoleonic Wars 1803–1815, New York, Random House, 2011, Chapter 6.) covered the line between Mainz and Giessen. The Austrian army consisted of professionals, many moved from the border regions in the Balkans, and conscripts drafted from the Imperial Circles. (Note: Beginning in the sixteenth century, the Holy Roman Empire was organized loosely into ten "circles", or regional groups of ecclesiastical, dynastic, and secular polities that coordinated economic, military and political actions. During times of war, the Circles contributed troops to the Habsburg military by drafting (or soliciting volunteers) among their inhabitants. Some circles coordinated their efforts better than others; the Swabian Circle was among the more effective of the imperial circles at organizing itself and protecting its economic interests. See James Allen Vann, The Swabian Kreis: Institutional Growth in the Holy Roman Empire 1648–1715. Vol. LII, Studies Presented to International Commission for the History of Representative and Parliamentary Institutions. Bruxelles, 1975. Mack Walker. German Home Towns: Community, State, and General Estate, 1648–1871. Ithaca, 1998.)

Two French generals, Jean-Baptiste Jourdan and Jean Victor Moreau, commanded (respectively) the Army of Sambre-et-Meuse and the Army of Rhin-et-Moselle at the outset of the 1796 campaign. The French citizens' army was created by mass conscription of young men and systematically divested of old men who might have tempered the rash impulses of teenagers and young adults. It had already made itself odious, by rumor and action, throughout France. Furthermore, it was an army entirely dependent upon the countryside for its material support. After April 1796, pay was made in metallic value, but pay was still in arrears. Throughout the spring and early summer, the unpaid French army was in almost constant mutiny: in May 1796, in the border town of Zweibrücken, the 74th Demi-brigade revolted. In June, the 17th Demi-brigade was insubordinate (frequently) and in the 84th Demi-brigade, two companies rebelled. The French commanders understood that an assault into the German states was essential, not only in terms of war aims, but also in practical terms: furthermore, the French Directory believed that war should pay for itself, and did not budget for the payment or feeding of its troops.

== Terrain ==
=== Geography ===
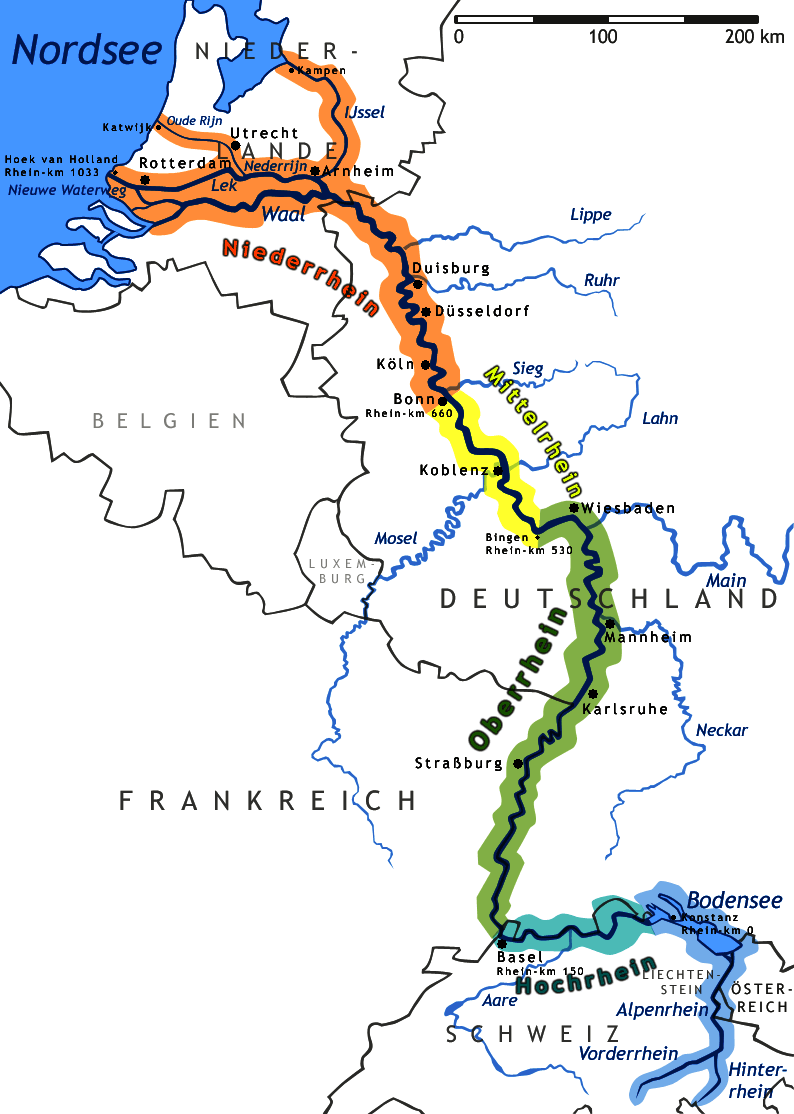
Map of Rhine river shows Düsseldorf and the Sieg and Lahn rivers in the north and Strasbourg and Mannheim in the south. The colors different sections of the rhine River: blue is the Alp Rhine and the Lake Rhine (where the river runs through Lake Constance); turquoise indicates the High Rhine (which runs east to west through of Lake Constance); The Upper Rhine (green) begins where the river takes a sharp turn at the Rhine Knee, and flows south to north; yellow designates the Middle Rhine (sometimes called Mittelrhein) and orange designates the Low Rhine, where the Rhine passes into the Netherlands and reaches the North Sea.

The Rhine river begins in the Canton of Graubünden (also called the Grisons), near Lake Toma and flows along the alpine region bordered by Liechtenstein, northward into Lake Constance where it traverses the lake in three "ditches": Oberseerhein, Seerhein, and Unterseerhein, . From there, it leaves the lake at Reichenau and flows westerly along the border between the German states and the Swiss Cantons. (Note: These territories include present-day Baden-Württemberg and the Cantons of Schaffhausen, Aargau, Basel-land, and Basel-Stadt. Schaffhausen and Aargau attained canton status in the peace settlement of 1803, a de facto acceptance of the Swiss Revolution of 1798–99; Basel-land and Basel-Stadt were created from the Canton Basel in 1833.) The 130-kilometer (81 mi) stretch between Rheinfall, by Schaffhausen and Basel, called the High Rhine, cuts through steep hillsides and flows over a gravel bed; in such places as the former rapids at Laufenburg, it moved in torrents. (Note: Laufenburg now has dams and barrages to control the flow of water. Thomas P. Knepper. The Rhine. Handbook for Environmental Chemistry Series, Part L. New York: Springer, 2006, ISBN 978-3-540-29393-4, pp. 5–19.) At Basel, the terrain flattens. There the Rhine makes a wide, northerly turn, in what is called the Rhine knee, and enters the what the locals call the Rhine ditch (Rheingraben), part of a rift valley bordered by the Black Forest on the east and Vosges mountains on the west. Called the Upper Rhine (distinguished from the High Rhine), the river flows south to north. In 1796, the plain on both sides of the river, some 31 km (19 mi) wide, was dotted with villages and farms. At both far edges of the flood plain, especially on the eastern side, the old mountains created dark shadows on the horizon. Tributaries cut through the hilly terrain of the Black Forest, creating deep defiles in the mountains. The tributaries then wound in rivulets through the flood plain to the river.

The Rhine River itself looked different in the 1790s than it does in the twenty-first century; the passage from Basel to Iffezheim was "corrected" (straightened) between 1817 and 1875 to make year-round transport easier. Between 1927 and 1975, the construction of a canal allowed the control of the water level. In the 1790s, though, the river was wild and unpredictable, in some places four or more times wider than the twenty-first century incarnation of the river, even under regular conditions. Its channels wound through marsh and meadow, and created islands of trees and vegetation that were periodically submerged by floods. It was crossable at Kehl, by Strasbourg, and Hüningen, by Basel, where systems of viaducts and causeways made access reliable.

=== Political terrain ===
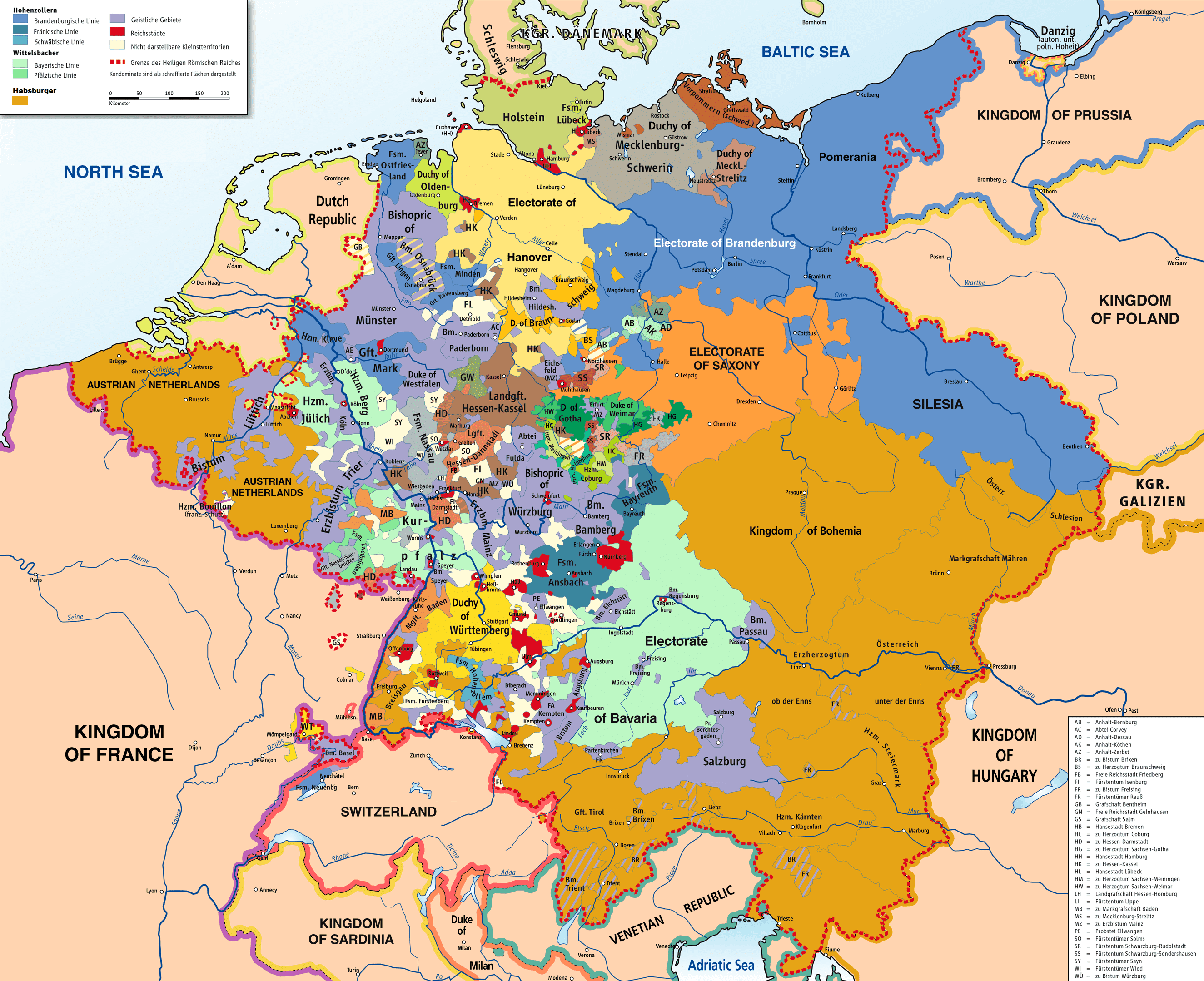
The plethora of states of the Holy Roman Empire was especially dense on the east bank of the Rhine.

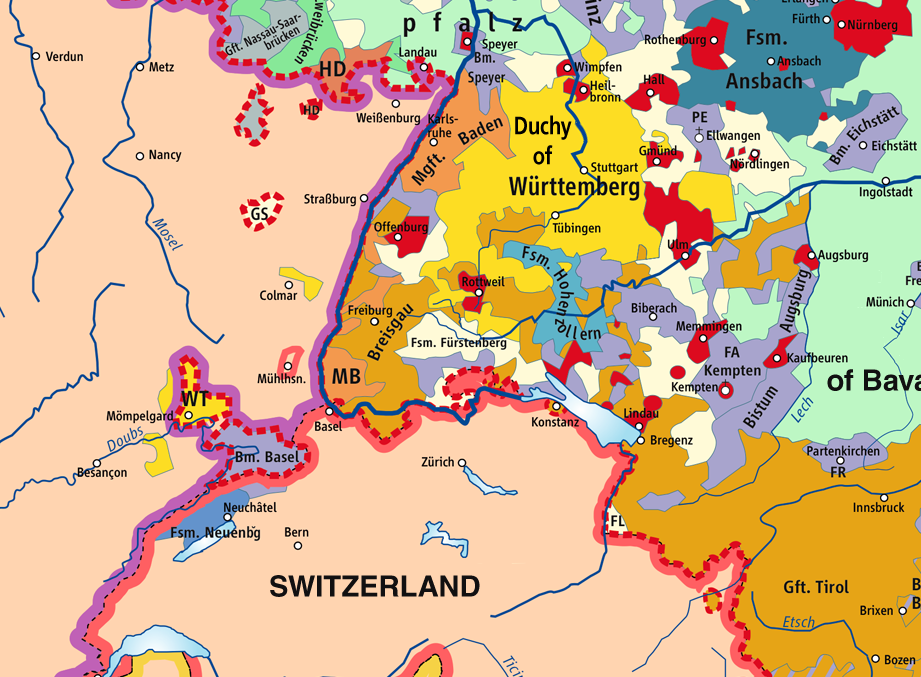
In particular, the states involved in late 1796 included, for example, the Breisgau (Habsburg), Offenburg and Rottweil (free cities), the territories belonging to the princely families of Fürstenberg and Hohenzollern, the Duchy of Baden, the Duchy of Württemberg, and several dozen ecclesiastic polities. The light cream-colored territories are so subdivided they cannot be named.

The German-speaking states on the east bank of the Rhine were part of the vast complex of territories in central Europe called the Holy Roman Empire. The considerable number of territories in the Empire included more than 1,000 entities. Their size and influence varied, from the Kleinstaaterei, the little states that covered no more than a few square miles, or included several non-contiguous pieces, to the small and complex territories of the princely Hohenlohe family branches, to such sizable, well-defined territories as the Kingdoms of Bavaria and Prussia. The governance of these many states varied: they included the autonomous free imperial cities, also of different sizes and influence, from the powerful Augsburg to the minuscule Weil der Stadt; ecclesiastical territories, also of varying sizes and influence, such as the wealthy Abbey of Reichenau and the powerful Archbishopric of Cologne; and dynastic states such as Württemberg. When viewed on a map, the Empire resembled a "patchwork carpet". Both the Habsburg domains and Hohenzollern Prussia also included territories outside the Empire. There were also territories completely surrounded by France that belonged to Württemberg, the Archbishopric of Trier, and Hesse-Darmstadt. Among the German-speaking states, the Holy Roman Empire's administrative and legal mechanisms provided a venue to resolve disputes between peasants and landlords, between jurisdictions, and within jurisdictions. Through the organization of Imperial Circles, also called Reichskreise, groups of states consolidated resources and promoted regional and organizational interests, including economic cooperation and military protection. Many of these territories were not contiguous: a village could belong predominantly to one polity, but have a farmstead, a house, or even one or two strips of land that belonged to another polity.

== French strategy ==
At the end of the Rhine Campaign of 1795 the two sides had called a truce. However, war plans did not cease. In a decree on 6 January 1796, Lazare Carnot gave Germany priority over Italy as a theater of war. Jean-Baptiste Jourdan commanding the Army of Sambre-et-Meuse was instructed to besiege Mainz and cross the Rhine into Franconia. Farther south, Jean Victor Marie Moreau was to lead the Army of Rhin-et-Moselle across the Rhine, besiege or take Mannheim, and invade Duchy of Baden, Swabia, and the Duchy of Bavaria. Ultimate, Moreau was to converge on Vienna while Jourdan would veer south to provide a rear guard. On the secondary front, Napoleon Bonaparte was to invade Italy, neutralize the Kingdom of Sardinia and seize Lombardy from the Austrians. Hopefully, the Italian army would cross the Alps via the County of Tyrol and join the other French armies in crushing the Austrian forces in southern Germany. By the spring of 1796, Jourdan and Moreau each had 70,000 men while Bonaparte's army numbered 63,000, including reserves and garrisons. Additionally, François Christophe de Kellermann counted 20,000 troops in the Army of the Alps and there was an even smaller army in southern France. The French First Republic's finances were in poor shape so its armies were expected to invade new territories and then live off the conquered lands.

== Coalition and French forces ==
Knowing that the French planned to invade southern Germany, on 20 May 1796 the Austrians announced that the truce would end on 31 May, and prepared for invasion. The Army of the Lower Rhine was commanded by the 25-year-old Archduke Charles, Duke of Teschen and counted 90,000 troops. The 20,000-man right wing under Duke Ferdinand Frederick Augustus of Württemberg was on the east bank of the Rhine behind the river Sieg observing the French bridgehead at Düsseldorf. The garrisons of Mainz Fortress and Ehrenbreitstein Fortress counted 10,000 more. The remainder of Charles' army patrolled the west bank and behind the river Nahe. Dagobert Sigmund von Wurmser led the 80,000-strong Army of the Upper Rhine. Its right wing occupied Kaiserslautern on the west bank while the left wing under Anton Sztáray, Michael von Fröhlich and Louis Joseph, Prince of Condé guarded the Rhine from Mannheim to Switzerland. The original Austrian strategy was to capture Trier and to use this position on the west bank to strike at each of the French armies in turn. However, Wurmser was sent to Italy with 25,000 reinforcements after news arrived of Bonaparte's early successes. In the new situation, the Aulic Council gave Archduke Charles command over both Austrian armies and the Imperial contingents of the Holy Roman Empire, and ordered him to hold his ground. Imperial contingents were usually raw recruits drafted from the administrative districts of the Empire. In Spring, 1796, when resumption of war appeared eminent, the 88-members of the Swabian Circle, which included most of the states (ecclesiastical, secular, and dynastic) in Upper Swabia, had raised a small force of about 7,000 men. These were field hands and day laborers drafted for service, but untrained in military matters. It was largely guess work where they should be placed, and Charles did not like to use the militias in any vital location. In early late May and early June, when the French started to mass troops by Mainz as if they would cross there—they even engaged the Imperial force at Altenkirchen (4 June) and Wetzler and Uckerath (15 June)—Charles thought that main attack would occur there and felt few qualms placing the 7,000 Swabians at the crossing by Kehl.

At the start of the campaign, the 80,000-man Army of Sambre-et-Meuse held the west bank of the Rhine down to the Nahe and then southwest to Sankt Wendel. On the army's left flank, Jean-Baptiste Kléber had 22,000 troops in an entrenched camp at Düsseldorf. Carnot's grand plan called for the two French armies to press against the Austrian flanks. But first, Jourdan's army would push south from Düsseldorf. It was hoped that this advance would induce the Austrians to withdraw all of their forces from the Rhine's west bank. It would also focus Austrian attention northward, allowing Moreau's army to more easily strike in the south. The right wing of the Army of Rhin-et-Moselle was positioned behind the Rhine from Huningue (Hüningen) northward, its center was along the Queich River near Landau and its left wing extended west toward Saarbrücken.

Pierre Marie Barthélemy Ferino led Moreau's Right Wing, Louis Desaix commanded the Center and Laurent Gouvion Saint-Cyr directed the Left Wing. Ferino's wing consisted of three divisions under François Antoine Louis Bourcier, 9,281 infantry and 690 cavalry, Henri François Delaborde, 8,300 infantry and 174 cavalry and Augustin Tuncq, 7,437 infantry and 432 cavalry. Desaix's command counted three divisions led by Michel de Beaupuy, 14,565 infantry and 1,266 cavalry, Antoine Guillaume Delmas, 7,898 infantry and 865 cavalry and Charles Antoine Xaintrailles, 4,828 infantry and 962 cavalry. Saint-Cyr's wing had two divisions commanded by Guillaume Philibert Duhesme, 7,438 infantry and 895 cavalry and Alexandre Camille Taponier, 11,823 infantry and 1,231 cavalry. Altogether, Moreau's Army of Rhin-et-Moselle numbered 71,581 foot soldiers and 6,515 cavalry. Gunners and sappers are not included in the total.

== Actions ==
=== Blockades ===
On 9 June 1796, 36000 French troops blockaded the fortresses at Mainz and Ehrenbreitstein, challenging important strongholds at the confluence of the Main and Rhine rivers, and the Rhine and Moselle rivers, The blockades at Ehrenbreitstein started on 9 June, and at Mainz on 14 June.

=== Maudach ===
Action at Maudach
Date	15 June 1796
Location	Maudach, Germany
Result	French victory

Belligerents
French Empire	Austrian Empire

Commanders and leaders
(France) Louis Desaix	(Habsburg monarchy) Franz Petrasch

Units involved
(France) Army of Sambre-et-Meuse	(Habsburg monarchy) Army of the Lower Rhine

Strength
27,000 infantry 3,000 cavalry	11,000 infantry and cavalry

Casualties and losses
600	1,800 killed wounded and missing

On 15 June, at the village of Maudauch, 36 miles from Speyer, and a few kilometers from Ludwigshafen, 27,000 French infantry and 3,000 cavalry set upon 11,000 Imperial and Habsburg troops. The coalition lost 10 percent of its force, missing killed or wounded. Louis Desaix, commanding the left (northern) column of the Army of the Rhine and Moselle, had about 27,000 infantry and 3,000 cavalry when he crossed the Rhine at Maudach. He faced Petrasch's division of about a third of the size, including mixed troops of infantry and dragoons. While Desaix crossed at Maudauch, Jourdan's main body crossed the Rhine on 10 June at Neuwied to join Kléber and the Army of Sambre-et-Meuse advanced to the Lahn river.

=== Wetzlar and Uckerath ===
Action at Wetzlar
Date	15 June 1796
Location	Wetzlar, Hesse, Germany 66 kilometres (41 mi) N of Frankfurt
Result	Coalition victory

Belligerents
French Empire	Austrian Empire

Commanders and leaders
(France) General Jourdan	(Habsburg monarchy) Archduke Charles

Units involved
(France) Army of Sambre-et-Meuse	(Habsburg monarchy) Army of the Lower Rhine

Strength
48,000	64,000

Casualties and losses
Wetzlar: 500, 7 guns Uckerath: 3,000	Wetzlar: 400; Uckerath: 600

At Wetzlar (15 June 1796), 11,000 French troops engaged part of the Habsburg Austrian army in its defenses on the Lahn river. The action ended in a Coalition victory when most of the French army began retreating to the west bank of the Rhine. Not all the Coalition force was engaged, but it was sufficiently strong to repel the French, who withdrew and split their force, Jourdan moving westward to secure the bridgehead at Neuwied, which he held unchallenged until the fall, and Kleber retreating northward toward Düsseldorf. Four days later, on the 19th, in a second engagement at Uckerath, the Coalition troops attacked Kleber's the French left wing in its retreat the French suffered more casualties than the Coalition force, and lost one of their colors.

=== Renchen ===
On 28 June at Renchen a French force of 20,000 overwhelmed a Coalition force of 6,000. Moreau' troops clashed with elements of a Habsburg Austrian army under Maximilian Anton Karl, Count Baillet de Latour which were defending the line of the Murg River. Leading the left (north) wing of Moreau's army, Louis Desaix attacked the Austrians and drove them back to the Alb River.

=== Neuwied ===
On 21 July, at Neuwied, Jourdan's southernmost flank encountered 8,000 Imperial troops, including a small group of Hessians, a battalion of French emigre troops, and the contingent from Münster.

=== Giessen ===
On 8 July at Giessen, a small town in Hesse, 20,000 French troops, part of Jourdan's Army of the Sambre-et-Meuse, surprised an Austrian garrison or 4,500 and captured the town.

=== Friedberg ===
On 10 July, after hearing about Moreau's successful assault on Keh and subsequent crossing of the Rhine, Jourdan took the 30,000 men of the Army of the Sambre-et-Meuse back across the Rhine and attacked the 6,000 men of Wartensleben's force.

=== Cannstatt ===
On 21 July, at Cannstatt, a small town on the east bank of the Neckar outside of Stuttgart, part of Moreau's Army of the Rhine & Moselle attacked and overwhelmed 8,000 coalition troops.

== Notes, citations, and alphabetical list of resources ==
=== Alphabetical list of resources ===
- Alison, Sir Archibald 1st Baronet (1847). History of Europe from the Commencement of the French Revolution to the Restoration of the Bourbons. Vol. 3. Edinburgh: Blackwood.
- Blanning, Timothy (1998). The French Revolutionary Wars. New York: Oxford University Press. ISBN 978-0340569115.
- Blanning, Timothy (1983). The French Revolution in Germany. New York: Oxford University Press. ISBN 978-0198225645.
- Chandler, David G. (1966). The Campaigns of Napoleon. New York, N.Y: Macmillan.
- Charles, Archduke of Austria (unattributed) (1796). Geschichte des Feldzuges von 1796 in Deutschland. France. OCLC 693115692.
- Cuccia, Phillip (2014). Napoleon in Italy: the Sieges of Mantua, 1796–1799. Oklahoma: University of Oklahoma. ISBN 978-0806144450.
- Dodge, Theodore Ayrault (2011). Warfare in the Age of Napoleon: The Revolutionary Wars Against the First Coalition in Northern Europe and the Italian Campaign, 1789-1797. USA: Leonaur Ltd. ISBN 978-0-85706-598-8.
- Dupuy, Roger (2005). La période jacobine : terreur, guerre et gouvernement révolutionnaire : 1792-1794 (in French). Paris: Seuil. ISBN 9782020398183.
- Ersch, Johann Samuel (1889). Allgemeine encyclopädie der wissenschaften und künste in alphabetischer folge von genannten schrifts bearbeitet und herausgeben (in German). Leipzig: J. F. Gleditsch. pp. 64–66.
- Hansard, Thomas C, ed. (1803). Hansard's Parliamentary Debates, House of Commons, 1803, Official Report. Vol. 1. London: HMSO.
- Knepper, Thomas P. (2006). The Rhine. Handbook for Environmental Chemistry Series, Part L. New York: Springer. ISBN 978-3-540-29393-4.
- Lefebvre, Georges (1964). The French Revolution, Volume II From 1793–1799. New York: Columbia University Press. pp. 199–201. ISBN 0-231-02519-X.
- Mechel von, Christian (1798). Tableaux historiques et topographiques ou relation exacte... Basel. pp. 64–72. OCLC 715971198.
- Philippart, John (1814). Memoires etc. of General Moreau, London, A.J. Valpy. OCLC 45089676
- Phipps, Ramsay Weston (2011). The Armies of the First French Republic: Volume II The Armées du Moselle, du Rhin, de Sambre-et-Meuse, de Rhin-et-Moselle. USA: Pickle Partners Publishing. ISBN 978-1-908692-25-2.
- Rickard, J. (2009). "Combat of Siegburg, 1 June 1796". historyofwar.org.
- Rickard, J. (2009). "First battle of Altenkirchen, 4 June 1796". historyofwar.org.
- Rothenberg, Gunther Erich (1980). The Art of Warfare in the Age of Napoleon. Indiana University Press. ISBN 978-0253202604.
- Smith, Digby (1998). The Napoleonic Wars Data Book. London: Greenhill. ISBN 1-85367-276-9.
- Smith, Digby; Kudrna, Leopold. "Austrian Generals of 1792-1815: Württemberg, Ferdinand Friedrich August Herzog von". napoleon-series.org.
- Vann, James Allen (1975). The Swabian Kreis: Institutional Growth in the Holy Roman Empire 1648–1715. Vol. 52. Brussels: Studies Presented to International Commission for the History of Representative and Parliamentary Institutions.
- Volk, Helmut. "Landschaftsgeschichte und Natürlichkeit der Baumarten in der Rheinaue". Waldschutzgebiete Baden-Württemberg. 10: 159–167.
- Walker, Mack (1998). German home towns: community, state, and general estate, 1648–1871. Ithaca, N.Y.: Cornell University Press. OCLC 2276157.
- Whaley, Joachim (2012). Germany and the Holy Roman Empire: Volume I: Maximilian I to the Peace of Westphalia, 1493–1648. Vol. 1. Oxford University Press. ISBN 978-0199688821.
