= Antoine-François Delandine =

French writer (1756–1820)

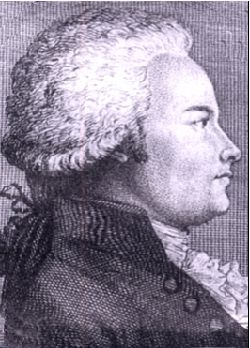
Antoine-François Delandine

Antoine-François Delandine (5 March 1756 – 5 May 1820), was a French writer.

Delandine was born in Lyon. A lawyer at the Parliament of Dijon and the Parliament of Paris, he had a brief political career during the French Revolution when he was elected to the Estates-General of 1789 as deputy of the Forez. He was imprisoned during the Reign of Terror because of his opposition to the Republicans. He survived and went on to become the director of the municipal library of Lyon.

== Main works ==
- Dissertations historiques sur des antiquités de Bresse et de Lyon (1780)
- L'Enfer des peuples anciens, ou Histoire des dieux infernaux (1784)
- De la Philosophie corpusculaire, ou des Connoissances et des procédés magnétiques chez les divers peuples (1785)
- Observations sur les romans et en particulier sur ceux de Mme de Tencin (1786)
- Couronnes académiques, ou Recueil des prix proposés par les sociétés savantes, avec les noms de ceux qui les ont obtenus, des concurrents distingués, des auteurs qui ont écrit sur les mêmes sujets, précédé de l'histoire abrégée des Académies de France (1787)
- Le Conservateur, ou Bibliothèque choisie de littérature, de morale et d'histoire (4 vol., 1787-1788)
- Des États-généraux, ou Histoire des assemblées nationales en France, des personnes qui les ont composées, de leur forme, de leur influence, & des objets qui y ont été particulièrement traités (1788)
- De quelques changements politiques opérés ou projetés en France pendant les années 1789, 1790 et 1791, ou Discours sur divers points importants de la constitution et de la nouvelle législation du royaume (1791)
- Almanach civil, politique et littéraire de Lyon et du département du Rhône, pour l'an VI de la Rép. et les années 1797 et 1798 de l'ère ancienne, avec des Essais historiques sur Lyon (1797)
- Tableau des prisons de Lyon, pour servir à l'histoire de la tyrannie de 1792 et 1793 (1797)
- Mémoires bibliographiques et littéraires, des anciennes bibliothèques de Lyon, et en particulier de celle de la ville [1800; réimp. 1810]
- Bibliothèque publique de Lyon. État de la bibliothèque (5 vol., 1805-1811)
- Nouveau dictionnaire historique, ou Histoire abrégée de tous les hommes qui se sont fait un nom depuis le commencement du monde jusqu'à nos jours, avec des tables chronologiques, par Louis-Mayeul Chaudon et Antoine-François Delandine, (8e édition, 1808). Réédition sous le titre : Dictionnaire historique, critique et bibliographique, contenant les vies des hommes illustres, suivi d'un dictionnaire abrégé des mythologies et d'un tableau chronologique des événements les plus remarquables qui ont eu lieu depuis le commencement du monde, par Louis-Mayeul Chaudon et Antoine-François Delandine, continué par Jean-Daniel Goigoux (20 vol., 1810-1812; 30 vol., 1821-1823)
- Manuscrits de la bibliothèque de Lyon, ou Notices sur leur ancienneté, leurs auteurs, etc., précédées d'une histoire des anciennes bibliothèques de Lyon, et en particulier de celle de la ville (3 vol., 1812)
- Bibliographie dramatique, ou Tablettes alphabétiques du théâtre des diverses nations, précédé d'une notice sur l'origine du théâtre français (1818)

== Sources ==
- Bulletin historique et archéologique du diocèse de Lyon, Vol. 3–4, Lyons, 1924.
