= Optiquest =

Optiquest is a line of budget LCD (and formerly CRT) displays by ViewSonic.

They differ from the main ViewSonic product line in several ways, such as availability of parts to warranty length.
