= Esprit-Joseph Chaudon =

French bibliographer and writer (1738–1800)

Esprit-Joseph Chaudon (1738–1800) was a French bibliographer and writer.

He was born in Valensole. After teaching the humanities in several colleges of the Oratoire, Chaudon embarked on a literary career publishing anonymously in 1772, at Avignon, a valuable bibliographical work, entitled Bibliothèque d'un homme de gout, many materials of which were provided by his brother, Louis-Mayeul Chaudon.

In 1778 he published in Paris a Dictionnaire interprète-manuel des noms latins de la géographie ancienne et moderne.

== Works ==
- Les Imposteurs démasqués et les usurpateurs punis, ou Histoire de plusieurs aventuriers qui ayant pris la qualité d'empereur, de roi, de prince, d'ambassadeur, de tribun, de messie, de prophète, etc., ont fini leur vie dans l'obscurité ou par une mort violente, 1776.
- Dictionnaire interprète-manuel des noms latins de la géographie ancienne et moderne, pour servir à l'intelligence des auteurs latins, 1777.
- Les Flèches d'Apollon, ou Nouveau Recueil d'épigrammes anciennes et modernes, 2 vol., 1787.

== Sources ==
- George Ripley, Charles Anderson Dana, The new American cyclopaedia: a popular dictionary of general knowledge, Vol. 5, D. Appleton and company, 1859.
