= Esprit Systems =

Vendor of computer terminal products

Esprit Systems Inc.
- Company type: Private
- Industry: Computer
- Founded: January 1983; 42 years ago in Commack, New York
- Products: Thin clients

Esprit Systems Inc. was a vendor of computer terminal products created as a spin-off from Hazeltine Corporation's terminal division in January 1983. The name refers to the Hazeltine Esprit terminal, which division management felt the parent company was not properly marketing. The company sold a variety of terminals, adding other computer peripherals with their purchase of Percom in 1984. The new company quickly ran into financial difficulty and sold 49% of the company to its primary Taiwanese manufacturer, ADI Corporation, in March 1986, followed by a majority of purchase by ADI in 1988. By the early 2000s, their primary products were Windows CE-based thin client terminals. The last updates to the company web page were in 2003.
