= Sir James Erskine, 3rd Baronet =

British Army officer and art collector

Lieutenant-General Sir James Erskine Bt
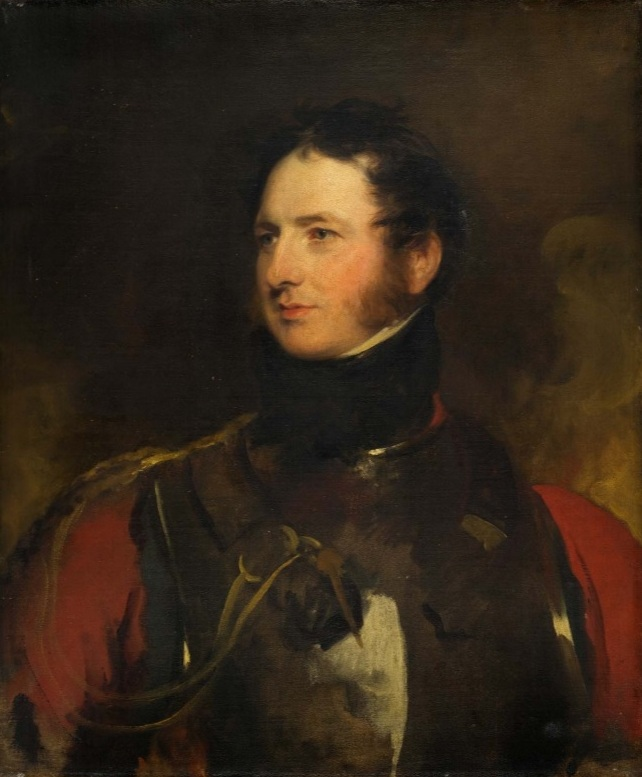
- Portrait by Sir Thomas Lawrence
- Born: 30 September 1772; Torrie House, Fife
- Died: 3 March 1825 (aged 52); Dover Street, London
- Spouse: Lady Louisa Paget (m. 1801–1825)
- Military career
- Allegiance: United Kingdom
- Branch: British Army
- Service years: 1788–1825
- Rank: Lieutenant-General
- Nickname: Jamie
- Commands: 133rd Regiment of Foot; 15th Light Dragoons; 2nd Dragoon Guards
- Conflicts: French Revolutionary Wars; Flanders campaign; Battle of Le Cateau; Battle of Tournay; Battle of Boxtel; Anglo-Russian Invasion of Holland; Battle of Alkmaar (WIA); Napoleonic Wars; Peninsular War

Lieutenant-General Sir James Erskine, 3rd Baronet (30 September 1772 – 3 March 1825) was a British Army officer who served through the French Revolutionary Wars and Napoleonic Wars, briefly commanding a brigade during the Peninsular War. Joining the army in 1788, Erskine was promoted quickly and by 1794 was a lieutenant-colonel. With the 37th Regiment of Foot he fought through the Flanders campaign, seeing action at the battles of Le Cateau, Tournay, and Boxtel. Taking command of the 15th Light Dragoons in 1796, he commanded the regiment during the Anglo-Russian Invasion of Holland in 1799, being wounded at the Battle of Alkmaar while repulsing a cavalry charge.

After several years serving as a staff officer in Ireland and Scotland, Erskine was promoted to major-general in 1808 and a year later was sent to serve in the Peninsular War. Given command of a cavalry brigade, after one month his health deteriorated to such an extent that he was invalided back to Britain. His last service was on the staff of the Western District from 1811 to 1813, at which point he was promoted to lieutenant-general. His elder brother Sir William Erskine committed suicide in the same year, leaving him to inherit the baronetcy. An avid art collector, he bequeathed his pieces, known as the Torrie Collection, to the University of Edinburgh.

== Early life ==
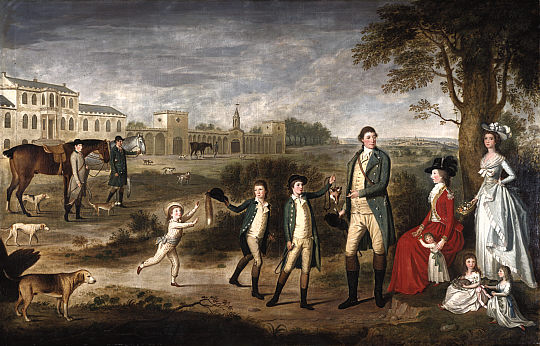
The Erskine family depicted by David Allan in 1788

James Erskine was born at Torrie House in Fife, Scotland, on 30 September 1772. He was the second son of Colonel William Erskine, who went on to earn a baronetcy as a general officer, and Frances née Moray. His older brother was also named William. Both brothers followed their father into service with the British Army.

== Military career ==
=== French Revolutionary Wars ===
Erskine joined the British Army as an ensign in the 26th Regiment of Foot on 26 February 1788. The following year the regiment was sent to serve in Canada, from where on 9 January 1793 Erskine purchased a lieutenancy in the 7th Regiment of Foot. He then advanced in rank again, becoming captain of an independent company on 8 March. With the French Revolutionary Wars underway, Erskine returned to England to take up his new post in July. There on 1 November he transferred to join the 37th Regiment of Foot.

With his new regiment Erskine was sent to serve in the Flanders campaign towards the end of the year. He saw action fighting at the Battle of Le Cateau on 29 March 1794, and then at Cysoing on 10 May. He was appointed to the brevet rank of major on 19 May and, continuing with the 37th, fought at the Battle of Tournay on 22 May. He then purchased promotion to lieutenant-colonel on 22 August. This was within the 133rd Regiment of Foot, but Erskine initially stayed on in Flanders, fighting at the Battle of Boxtel on 14 September.

Erskine left the continent to officially begin his command of the 133rd in April 1795, but he served with the unit only briefly before it was disbanded later in the year. Despite the regiment no longer existing, Erskine continued on full pay in it until 27 February 1796 when he exchanged places with his brother William, who was at the time lieutenant-colonel commanding the 15th Light Dragoons.

Erskine saw no further active service until 25 September 1799 when he took three troops of the 15th to join the Anglo-Russian Invasion of Holland. Erskine's force fought at the Battle of Alkmaar on 2 October, playing a prominent role. With the army advancing along the coast towards Egmond aan Zee, the 15th were placed in a position to ambush any French force attacking the British artillery. A French cavalry force numbering 500 men sallied out and surrounded the artillery. Advancing with two of his troops, Erskine pushed the French back, forcing them to reform. When they advanced again Erskine was reinforced by his third troop and counter-charged the enemy cavalry, chasing them for half a mile. Erskine was one of ten wounded members of the 15th, alongside three dead. The regiment continued in Holland until, the campaign having deteriorated, the army returned to Britain in November.

Erskine was promoted to brevet colonel on 1 January 1800 and as a reward for his conduct at Alkmaar was appointed an aide de camp to George III on 25 December the same year. He continued with the 15th until 10 February 1803 when he transferred to command the 2nd Dragoon Guards serving in Ireland.

=== Napoleonic Wars ===
The Napoleonic Wars having begun, on 3 March 1804 Erskine was appointed as a brigadier-general on the military staff in Ireland, continuing until 1806 when he was transferred to serve instead as a staff officer in Scotland. He was promoted to major-general on 25 April 1808.

Having continued to serve in Scotland after becoming a general officer, commanding a military district, Erskine was transferred to Portugal on 18 April 1809 to serve in the Peninsular War under Lieutenant-General Sir Arthur Wellesley, who shortly after was created Viscount Wellington. Wellington had planned to employ Erskine in command of a brigade of heavy cavalry on the Spanish border. An issue arose because the commander of the forces there, Major-General John Randoll Mackenzie, was junior in rank to Erskine. Wellington chose not to replace Mackenzie because Erskine had no experience of serving in the Iberian Peninsula, writing "I really believe that I should have every reason to place confidence in Gen. Erskine, if he had been a little longer in Portugal".

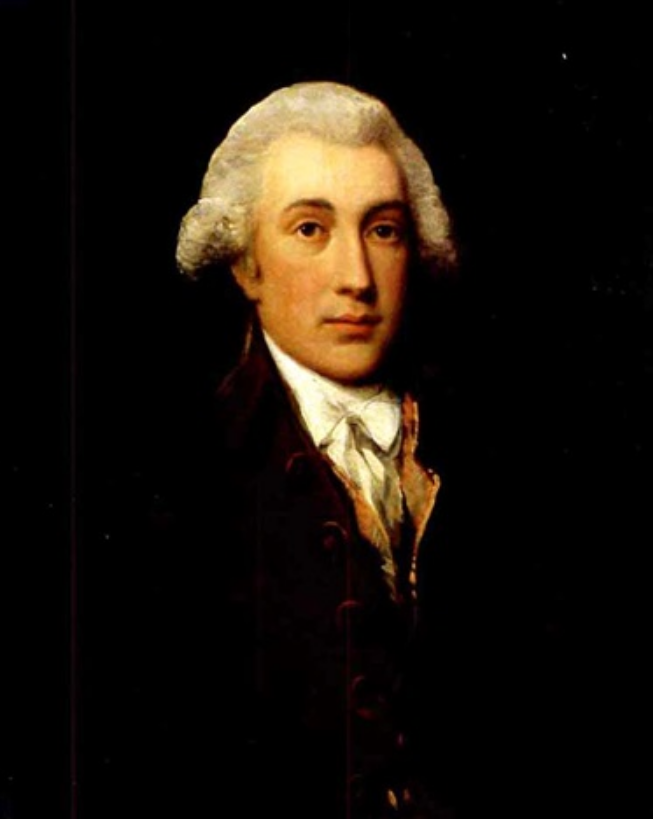
Erskine inherited the family baronetcy when his brother Sir William Erskine committed suicide

Erskine continued without a command until May when he was appointed to a newly created brigade of two cavalry regiments due to arrive shortly in Portugal. The 1st Hussars of the King's German Legion landed on 25 May, but Erskine had to wait until June for the 23rd Light Dragoons to complete his force. Taking command of his brigade, Erskine's health began to deteriorate with an undiagnosed illness described at the time as a severe indisposition. Berkeley Paget, Erskine's brother-in-law, described the effects: "Jamie was taken by certain tweaking of Intestines, denominated Spasms, attended by difficulty of suspiration, amounting (as said Jamie to General Stewart expresses himself) near to suffocation".

Erskine's condition worried Wellington to the extent that the general sent a letter to him requesting that he return home before he declined further, and provided a carriage to take him back to Lisbon. Erskine did as suggested and relinquished his brigade command on 16 July. There he was invalided out of the Peninsular War on 20 September. Wellington wrote again to Erskine, saying "I cannot conclude without expressing my concern to lose your assistance; I am convinced that, if you were to stay, you would be unable to afford me any, and that you will become worse instead of better".

Back in Britain Erskine was returned to employment as a staff officer in 1811, holding a command within Sussex and the Western District. His brother William, who had inherited the baronetcy from their father in 1795, was commanding the 2nd Cavalry Division in Portugal as a local lieutenant-general. He began to show increasing signs of insanity and was dismissed by Wellington in 1812. He committed suicide on 13 February 1813 by jumping from a window before he could be returned home, leaving Erskine to inherit the baronetcy.

Erskine continued to serve in the Western District until he was promoted to lieutenant-general on 4 June, after which he was not employed again and saw no further active service. He died in Dover Street, London, on 3 March 1825.

== Personal life ==
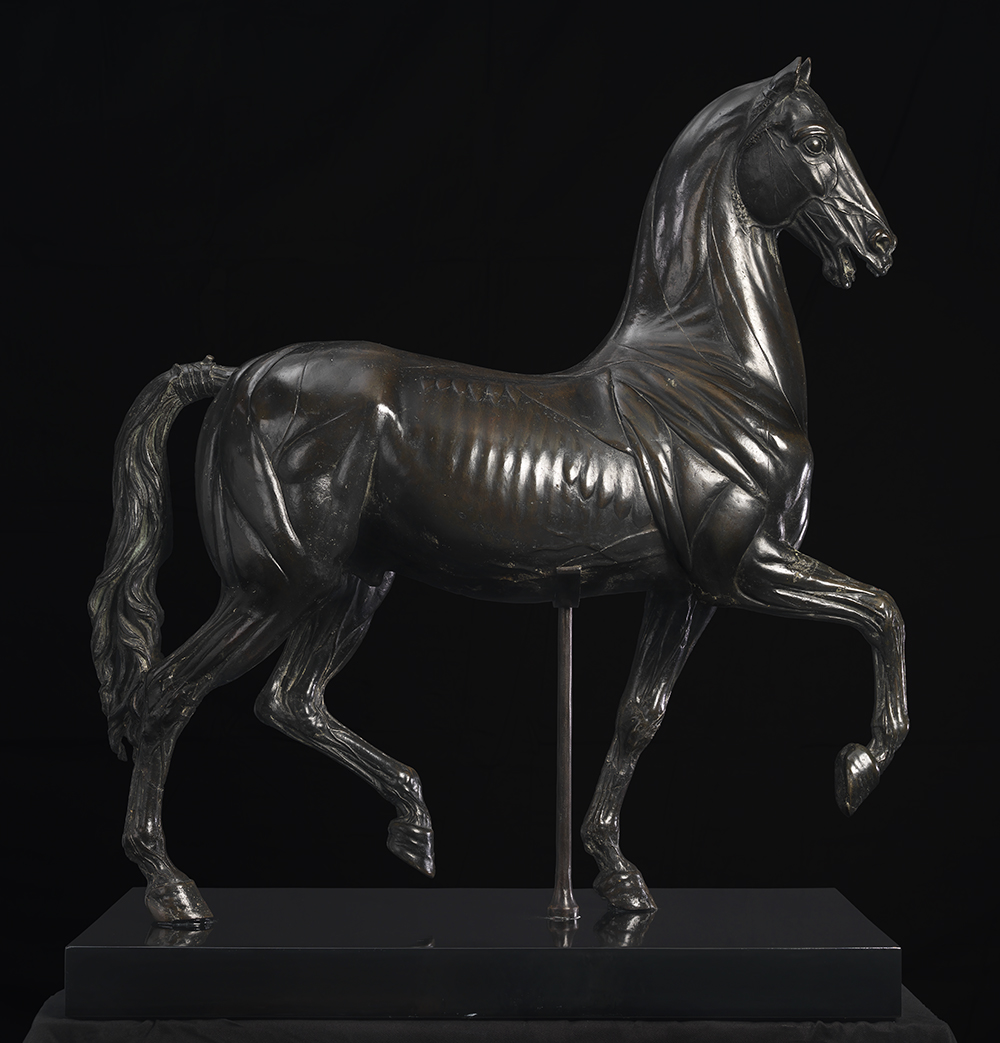
The Torrie Horse, owned by Erskine

Erskine was a well-known collector of art, focusing on Dutch and Flemish landscape paintings, Italian paintings, and Renaissance bronzes. He had previously taken lessons from the Scottish painter David Allan. The art was purchased in order to decorate Torrie House; the National Gallery of Scotland has noted that while Erskine collected a number of very valuable works, as a group it is of very uneven quality. The items became known as the Torrie Collection, and Erskine left them in his will to the University of Edinburgh for public display.

Amongst the paintings in the collection are Banks of a River by Jacob van Ruisdael, described by the university as "arguably the most important early painting by the artist anywhere in the world", and Cain and Abel by Abraham de Vries. There is also the anatomical sculpture the Torrie Horse by Giambologna. In 1821 Erskine travelled to Rome where the sculptor Thomas Campbell began a marble bust of him, completed two years later. It is now also part of the collection in Scotland.

Erskine married Lady Louisa Paget, the daughter of Henry Paget, 1st Earl of Uxbridge, on 5 March 1801. They had no children and upon Erskine's death the baronetcy was inherited by his younger brother John Erskine. Paget, known under her married name as Lady Louisa Erskine, ran away with Major-General Sir George Murray in 1820. They had an illegitimate daughter together and Erskine began divorce proceedings. The separation was never completed, but nonetheless the couple lived together in London, marrying soon after Erskine's death.

== Citations ==
Baronetage of Great Britain
Preceded by William Erskine	Baronet (of Torrie); 1813–1825	Succeeded by John Erskine
