= James Cordiner =

Episcopal clergyman in Ceylon and India

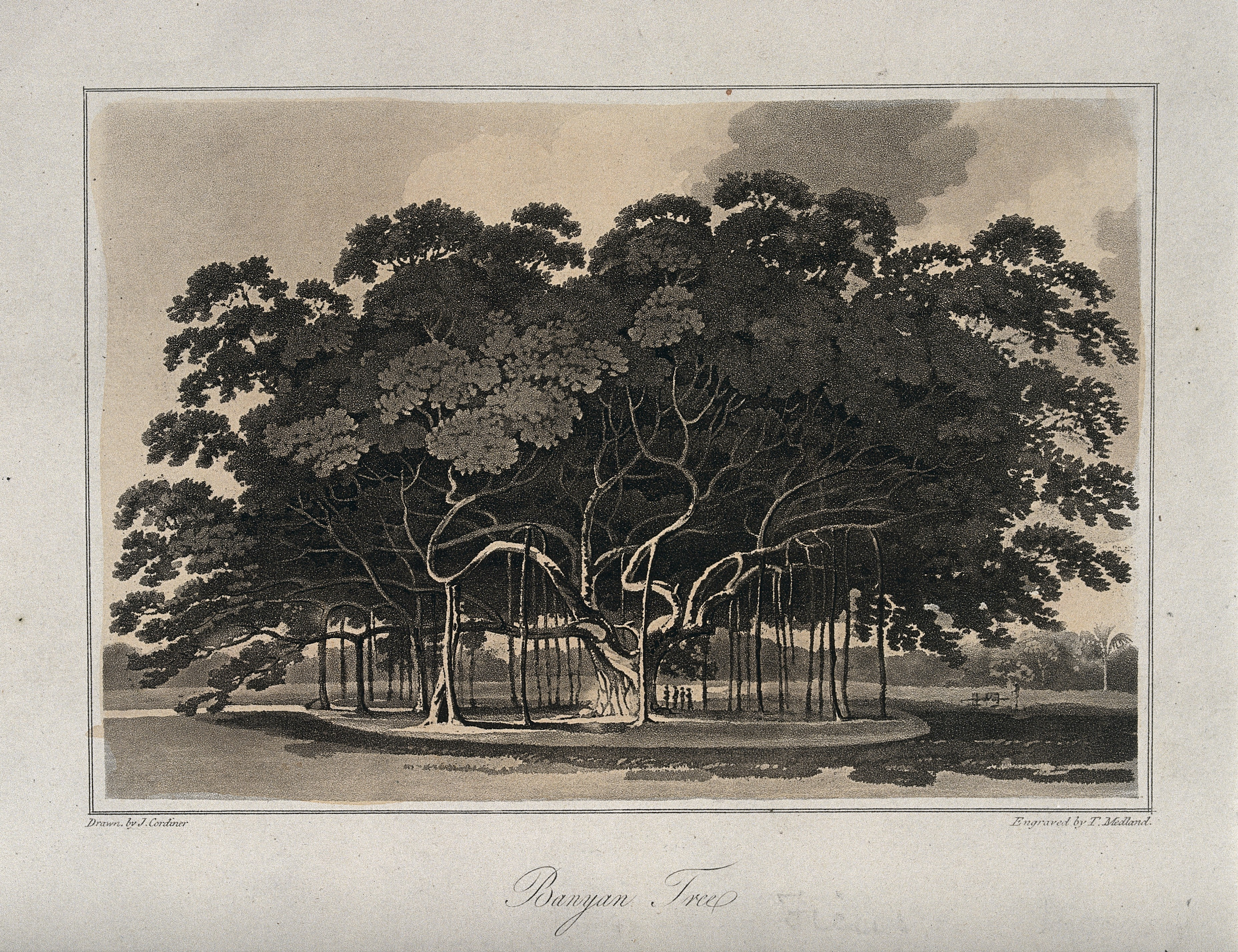
Banyan tree (Ficus benghalensis) with many spreading aerial roots. Aquatint by T. Medland, c. 1807, after J. Cordiner

James Cordiner (1775–1836) was a British minister and writer, the author of A Description of Ceylon.

== Life ==
=== Origins ===
James Cordiner, the third son of Charles Cordiner, Episcopal minister of Banff, was born in 1775. He received his primary education at Banff, and afterwards studied at the University and King's College, Aberdeen. His name appears in the university's record, specifically in an "album" or register of students, among those enrolled in the first class of Greek (taught by Professor John Leslie) during the 1789–1790 academic session. He is also listed in the roll of "Artium Magistri" dated 29 April 1793.

=== Ceylon ===
In 1797, James Cordiner was appointed to a position at the Military Orphan Asylum in Madras and assigned chaplain duties with the 80th Foot, stationed at Trincomalee, where he served for about 12 months. At the request of the governor, Frederick North (later Earl of Guilford), Cordiner then moved to Colombo to serve as chaplain to the 51st Foot, under orders for that place. He remained in Ceylon as the garrison chaplain at Colombo and principal of all the schools on the island. During his tenure, he was the only Church of England clergyman, up to 1804, when he returned home. Upon his departure, the civil and military officials in Colombo presented him with a piece of plate valued at 210 guineas, as a mark of their attachment and esteem.

=== Ministry ===
On 26 May 1807, Cordiner was appointed by the constituent members of the congregation to serve as one of the ministers at St. Paul's Episcopal Church (then referred to as chapel) in Aberdeen, at a stipend of £70 a year. It is believed that he came to Aberdeen from London on the recommendation of Roderick Macleod of St. Anne's, Soho. At that time, the community of Episcopalians worshipping at St. Paul's Chapel was not part of the Scottish Episcopalian Church. Instead, they aligned themselves with one of the Episcopalian communities that sought to maintain a connection with the Church of England, distinct from the native nonjuring Episcopalian body. This continued at St. Paul's until at least 1870.

=== Death ===
After faithfully discharging the duties of the ministry for many years, Cordiner resigned from his position on 13 November 1834, due to ill-health. He was granted a retiring annuity of £100, along with the chapel-house as a residence. Cordiner died from congestion of the lungs on 13 January 1836, at the age of 61, having served for 37 years in the ministry. He was buried in the churchyard of St. Nicholas, Aberdeen, where a tombstone was erected in his memory.

=== Family ===
He left a widow, who for many years received a small annuity of 12 guineas from the chapel funds, and a son, Charles, who became a clergyman of the Church of Scotland. Charles served as Presbyterian minister of Kinnenmouth, a chapel-of-ease in Lonmay parish, until at least 1864 .

== Works ==
After his return from Ceylon, Cordiner published A Description of Ceylon, with narratives of a Tour round the Island in 1800, the Expedition to Candy in 1803, and a Visit to Ramasseram in 1804 (London, 1807). According to the preface, Cordiner did not personally accompany the expedition to Kandy, but was provided with details from official sources. He is therefore not responsible for statements which, as Sir Emerson Tennent later noted, when read by the light of Governor North's confidential correspondence, it placed the authorities in a very regrettable light. The work, which is in two quarto volumes, features fine plates from original drawings by the author of objects of interest in the island. Cordiner wrote A Voyage to India, which was published in 1820.
