= Erskine baronets of Torrie (1791) =

Escutcheon of the Erskine baronets of Torrie

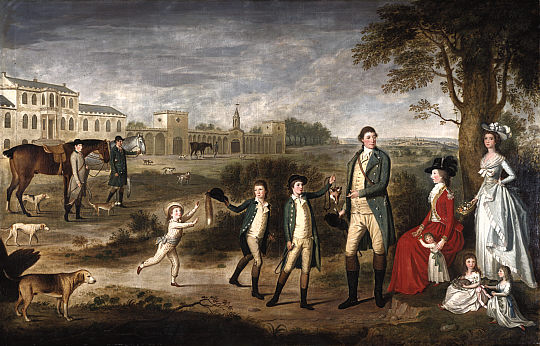
Sir William Erskine, 1st Baronet, of Torrie, with his family by David Allan

The Erskine Baronetcy, of Torrie in the County of Fife, was created in the Baronetage of Great Britain on 28 July 1791 for the soldier William Erskine. He was the grandson of Colonel the Hon. William Erskine, younger son of David Erskine, 2nd Lord Cardross (see Earl of Buchan).

His eldest son, the 2nd Baronet, was also a prominent soldier, and as well Member of Parliament for Fifeshire. The latter's two younger brothers, the 3rd and 4th Baronets, both succeeded in the title. The title became extinct on the death of the 4th Baronet in 1836.

== Erskine baronets, of Torrie (1791) ==
- Sir William Erskine, 1st Baronet (1728–1795)
- Sir William Erskine, 2nd Baronet (1770–1813)
- Sir James Erskine, 3rd Baronet (1772–1825)
- Sir John Erskine, 4th Baronet (1776–1836)

== Notes ==
Baronetage of Great Britain
Preceded by James baronets	Erskine baronets of Torrie; 28 July 1791	Succeeded by Martin baronets
