= Siege of Dunkirk (1793) =

Siege of the War of the First Coalition

- Part of the French Revolutionary Wars
Date	24 August to 8 September 1793
Location	Dunkirk, Nord, France 51.0383°N 2.3775°E
Result	French victory

Belligerents
French Republic	Great Britain; Habsburg Monarchy; Hanover; Hesse-Kassel

Commanders and leaders
Joseph Souham	Duke of York

Strength
10,000	35,100

Casualties and losses
1,000, 14 guns, 2 mortars	2,000, 32 heavy guns

The siege of Dunkirk took place in the Autumn of 1793 when British, Hanoverian, Austrian, and Hesse-Kassel troops under the command of Prince Frederick, Duke of York besieged the fortified French border port of Dunkirk, as part as the Flanders campaign of the French Revolutionary Wars. Following a Coalition defeat at the Battle of Hondshoote they were forced to raise the siege and withdraw northeast.

== Siege ==
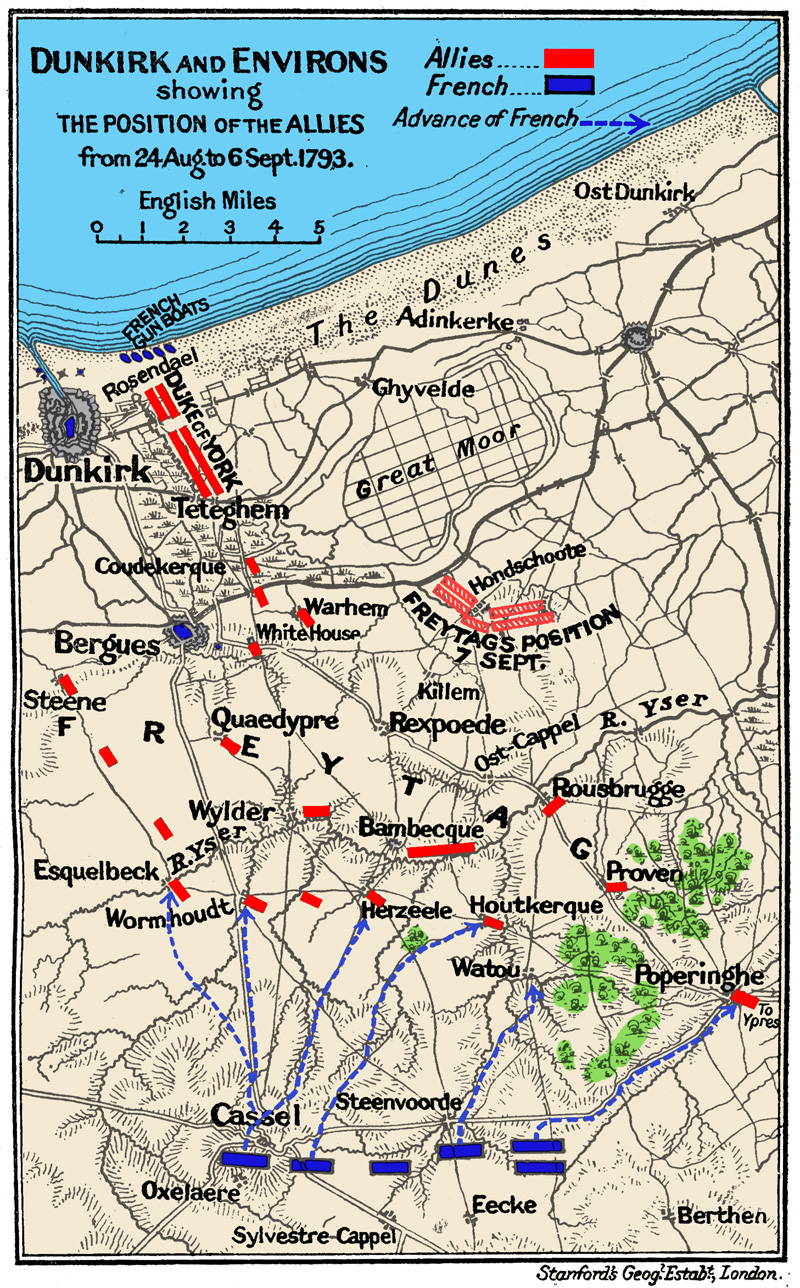
Map of the siege of Dunkirk and the Battle of Hondschoote

The decision to besiege Dunkirk was taken not by military commanders, but by the British government, chiefly by William Pitt's closest advisor, Secretary of State for War Henry Dundas. Dundas had considered the possession of Dunkirk as desirable, both as a bargaining chip in negotiations and as a potential British base in Europe. As a military objective towards winning the war, however, it was likely a mistake, as it prevented Prince Frederick, Duke of York from supporting the main Allied thrust further inland, and losing the strategic initiative.

Nevertheless, York followed instructions and through the latter days of August 1793 moved rapidly north-west, leaving the French mystified as to his objective. On 22 August he marched from Veurne (Furnes) to attack Dunkirk with 20,000 British, Austrians and Hessians troops, driving the French advance posts in confusion from the left bank of the Yser River to an entrenched camp at Ghyvelde, capturing 11 guns in the process. The Advance Guard consisting of the Austrian Sztáray Infantry Regiment Nr. 33 and O'Donnell's Freikorps lost 50 men killed and wounded. The commander of the Army of the North, Jean Nicolas Houchard was disgusted when he heard of the flight, writing to his superiors that "The soldiers are good, but the cowardice and crass ignorance of the officers make them learn cowardice, and to fly before the enemy is nothing to them". To protect York's left flank Heinrich Wilhelm von Freytag commanded a corps of 14,500 Hessian and Hanoverian troops which he spread across surrounding villages in a broad military cordon along the Yser to the south of Dunkirk.

On the right Feldmarschall-Leutnant József Alvinczi commanded the Austrian contingent, Lieutenant Generals Ralph Abercromby and Sir William Erskine, 1st Baronet led the British forces, and on the left Lieutenant General Buttlar led the Hessians.

Not only were the French surprised by York's advance, Dunkirk's defences were in a dilapidated condition.The town would most likely have fallen quickly had the promised Royal Navy fleet arrived on time, an English civilian witness wrote to the Public Advertiser that the town would have surrendered outright had it not been for Commissioners arriving from Paris to prevent it.

Meanwhile, in Paris the election of Lazare Carnot and Pierre Louis Prieur to the Committee of Public Safety was to have immediately beneficial consequences for the Republican field armies. Carnot realised that a defeat for Britain before Dunkirk would be a humiliating blow, and consequently, 40,000 men from other sectors were ordered to concentrate to the south of Dunkirk in support of the 5,000 defenders of the town under Joseph Souham. Most of these forces were concentrated near the entrenched camp at Cassel to take part in Carnot's intended flank attack, however on 24 August a column under the command of Jean-Baptiste Jourdan reached Loon, having been diverted from Lille over the head of Houchard by the Représentant en mission, and he was able to reinforce the Dunkirk garrison by 2,500 reinforcements to nearly 8,000, while the remainder occupied Bergues. Burne indicates these reinforcements were the repatriated former garrison of Valenciennes, who by the terms of surrender were supposed to be non-combatant. Jourdan was then transferred to command troops at the Cassel entrenched camp and replaced at Bergues by Leclaire. With the able assistance of his chief of staff, the young Lazare Hoche, Souham, and, later, Jacques Ferrand were able to act vigorously to bolster the demoralized defenders.

On the 24th York's reserve column (Austrian troops plus the flank companies of the British and Hessian regiments) under the Austrian Feldmarschall-Lieutenant Graf Eduard d'Alton took the suburb of Rosenthal and bundled the French back inside the walls of the town. "We suffered very little from their musketry, because they never attempted to dispute the ground with us, but kept firing and retreating; but they no sooner got under cover of their own guns, than they began to open upon us with both grape and round shot, and in our retreat to a convenient cover, we suffered considerably". York reported, "Unfortunately the ardour and gallantry of the troops carried them too far in spite of a peremptory order from me, three times repeated, they pursued the enemy upon the glacis of the place when we had the misfortune to lose many very brave and reliable men by the grapeshot from the town." Fortescue says York lost almost 400 casualties, though the Officer of the Guards gives returns as Austrians 170, British 74 and Hessians 55 killed and wounded. The casualties included d'Alton, who was shot and killed towards the end of the day.

Thereafter York's command began entrenching in a line from Téteghem to the sea. Confidence was high, however York was about to face a number of disappointments. Dundas had omitted to provide York with adequate equipment for a siege, and most importantly no heavy siege artillery. Siege guns had been due to arrive at Nieuport on the 26th, but the only vessels in sight were French gunboats that began bombarding York's right seaward flank with impunity. On 27 August, transports arrived to disembark the gun crews but no guns. On 30 August Admiral John MacBride arrived to coordinate naval operations, but without any fleet.

Equally worrying for York was the news of a further check on the Dutch forces of the Prince of Orange near Menin on the 28th, which widened the gap between his command and that of the main Austrian Army further south. Though he could ill afford it, York dispatched six squadrons of Hessian cavalry to bolster the Dutch line.

York was in a difficult position. Souham had opened the town sluices, which slowly inundated the fields connecting York to Freytag and filled British trenches on the dunes with two feet of water. "The inundations increasing daily, rendered the ground, on which the British encamped, a perfect swamp", and soon "An epidemical disorder called the Dunkirk Fever, soon broke out amongst the troops, increased daily, and carried off the soldiers rapidly". York hadn't the man-power to invest Dunkirk on more than one side, so the French were able to reinforce the town at any time; his right flank was constantly bombarded by French gunboats, and he had no siege equipment. In the end the British were only able to find ordnance by disarming a frigate at Furnes; these cannons arrived by canal at Dunkirk on the 27th.

== York's retreat ==
On 6 September Houchard led the French forces at the Cassel entrenched camp against Freytag's covering Hanoverian corps at the Battle of Hondshoote. On the same day the defenders of Dunkirk made a strong sally in order to pin down York's command, the focus of the attack being Alvinczi's Austrians on York's right flank. This assault was beaten back after intense close-quarter fighting and very considerable loss on both sides, Powell records the 14th Foot had 9 out of 11 officers injured and 253 men killed and wounded. One of the killed this day was York's chief of Engineers Colonel James Moncrief. On York's left flank Freytag's Hanoverians were eventually driven back to the town of Hondschoote. Since Freytag was wounded and briefly captured by the French before being rescued, Johann Ludwig, Reichsgraf von Wallmoden-Gimborn took command of the covering force. On the 8th Houchard attacked and forced Wallmoden to withdraw after a very hard defence.

With news of his left flank exposed the Duke of York gave orders for his heavy baggage to be withdrawn to Veurne (Furnes), then at a Council of War on the 8th it was decided to lift the siege of Dunkirk. Souham had rendered the canal unusable for transport, so the 24-pounder naval guns had to be spiked and abandoned. At 11.00 on the evening of the 8th York's corps began withdrawing to the coastal city of Veurne in Belgium, with Erskine commanding the rearguard. Progress was hindered by the weather and baggage, much of which was abandoned, Furnes was reached by 7.00 the next morning where contact was made with the remnants of Wallmoden's troops. York then moved off towards Diksmuide, leaving Abercromby behind at Veurne with 3,000 men, which remained until the 14th before marching through pouring rain to Thurout.

== Aftermath ==
On 11 September MacBride's fleet finally appeared off Nieuport, three weeks too late. Out of a total of 29,700 infantry and 5,400 cavalry in the whole operation, the Coalition forces lost 2,000 killed and wounded, plus a great many more to sickness due to the swampy environment. The Officer of the Guards estimated a total loss of 10,000 men (which probably includes the casualties from Hondschoote). In addition, they abandoned the 32 requisitioned naval guns to the French. The 8,000-man French garrison suffered 1,000 casualties, plus 14 guns, two mortars, six ammunition wagons, 17 colors, and three standards captured.

== Assessment ==
Alfred Burne devotes several pages assessing the siege of Dunkirk and Hondschoote, including much of the Duke of York's subsequent correspondence to the King. York ends his report: "I think therefore that I am justified in saying that there were three grand causes which made this expedition miscarry: the first owing to the promises and assurances I received from your Majesty's Ministers not being in any way fulfilled; the second owing to the alteration made in the plan of campaign by the Armies of the King of Prussia and of General Wurmser, by which means the enemy was able to bring the whole of the Army of the Moselle against the Field Marshal and Me; and the third owing to the Field Marshal's (i.e. Freytag's) own conduct."

An officer wrote to the Morning Chronicle just two days after the battle of Hondschoote: "There is but one sentiment throughout the whole camp. If the gun-boats and floating batteries had been ready, according to the express promise to co-operate with the Duke of York, and if his alacrity had been at all seconded on the part of the officers in England there is no doubt that Dunkirk would have fallen at the first attack. Every man that has since perished... is to be set down to the score of the ministers, who have sacrificed their duty to the holiday mummery of camps or to the amusements of partridge shooting".

Burne also points out the oft-overlooked fact that the French broke the terms of capitulation at Valenciennes, which dictated that released prisoners were not to fight again, and sent repatriated prisoners-of-war straight to reinforce the garrison of Dunkirk. "Had the French not broken the terms of capitulation of Valenciennes and used its garrison for the relief of Dunkirk, that town would probably have fallen."

Historian Digby Smith argues that Dunkirk represented a missed opportunity. He blames the British government for its insistence on mounting this operation instead of properly supporting their Austrian allies against the French field armies.

Burne, however, believes that although it transgresses the principle of concentration, in this case, it is extremely doubtful whether the Austrians would have marched on Paris without first taking Maubeuge and Quesnoy; therefore the British army was better employed capturing Dunkirk than helping the Austrians take Quesnoy.

== Bibliography ==
- Fortescue, John (1918), British Campaigns in Flanders 1690-1794 (extracts from Volume 4 of A History of the British Army), London: Macmillan, OCLC 1041627413.
- Brown, Robert (1795), An impartial Journal of a Detachment from the Brigade of Foot Guards, commencing 25th February, 1793, and ending 9th May, 1795, London: John Stockdale, OCLC 314586208.
- Anon. (1796), An Accurate and Impartial Narrative of the War, by an Officer of the Guards, London: Cadell and Davies, OCLC 1334702694.
- Powell, Thomas (1968), The Diary of Lieutenant Thomas Powell, 14th Regiment of Foot 1793-1795, London: The White Rose.
- Harvey, Robert (2007), War of Wars: The Epic Struggle Between Britain and France 1789-1815, London: Constable & Robinson, ISBN 9781845296353
- Rodger, Nicholas.A.M (2004), The command of the ocean : a naval history of Britain 1649-1815, London: Allen Lane, ISBN 9780713994117
- Smith, Digby (1998), The Napoleonic Wars Data Book, London: Greenhill, ISBN 1-85367-276-9
- Urban, Mark (2005), Generals: Ten British Commanders Who Shaped the World, London: Faber and Faber, ISBN 9780571224876
- Burne, Alfred (1949), The noble Duke of York; the military life of Frederick, duke of York and Albany, London: Staples Press, OCLC 2207843
