= Wilhelm von Freytag =

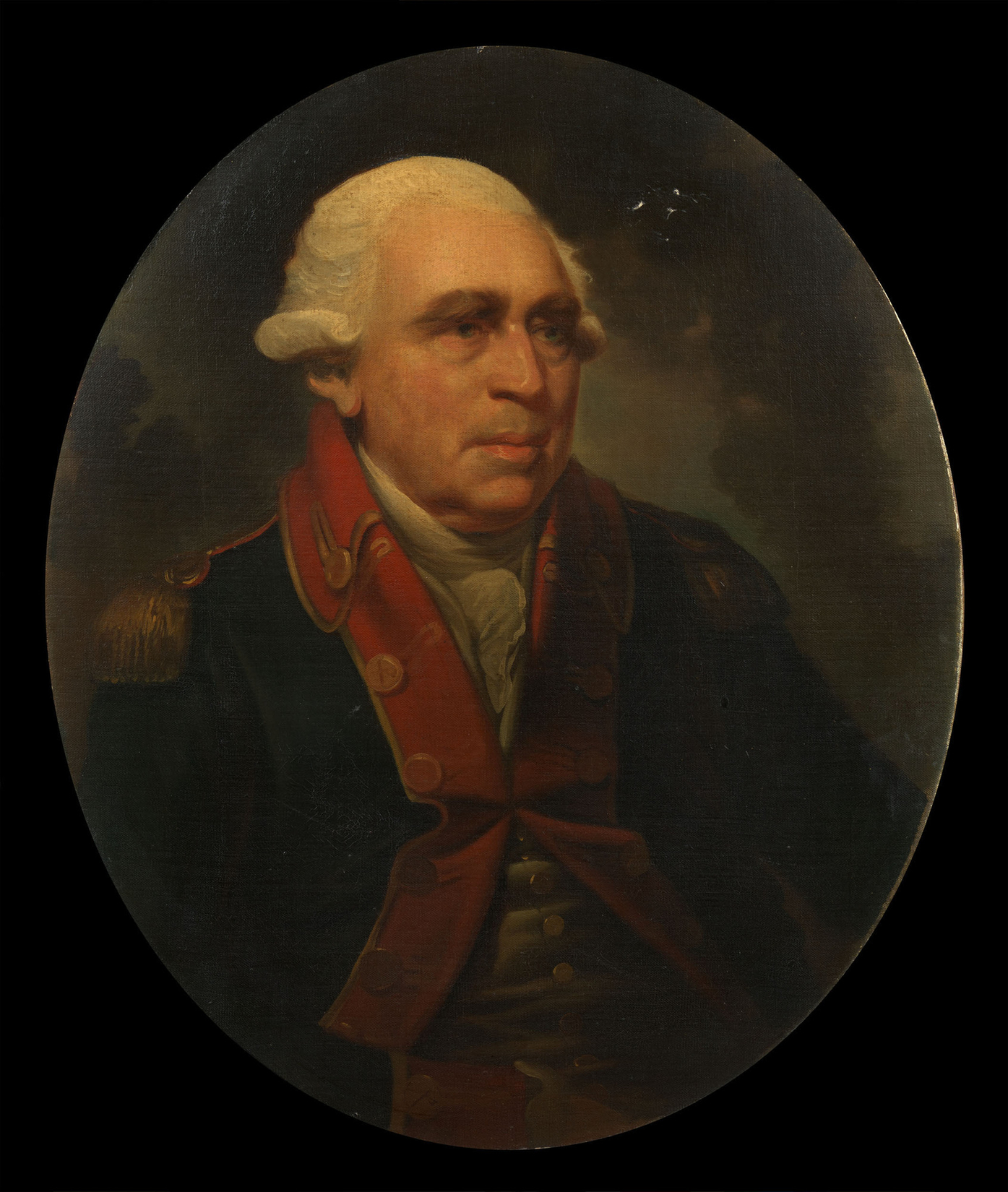
1794 portrait of Freytag by Mather Brown

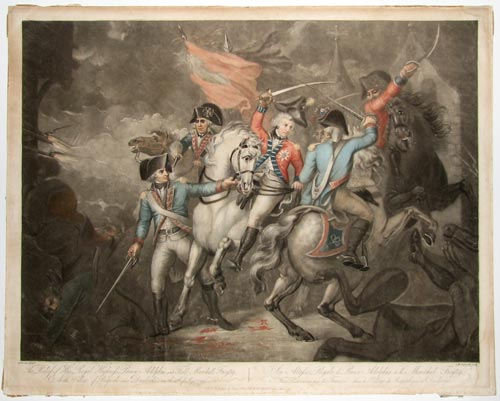
Freytag being captured by French troops at the Battle of Hondschoote

Field Marshal Heinrich Wilhelm von Freytag (17 March 1720 – 2 January 1798) was a Hanoverian Army officer. Born in Estorf, he served in the Seven Years' War and French Revolutionary Wars.

== Career ==
Freytag rose to prominence during the Seven Years' War, organising and commanding a corps of light infantry called Freytag Jäger. At the Battle of Bergen on 17 April 1759 he commanded nine companies of Jäger and two squadrons of Prussian Hussars. Promoted to field marshal in 1792, he was appointed to raise and command the 3,873-man Hanoverian electoral contingent to the Holy Roman Empire. This force was absorbed into the general army mobilization at the end of 1792.

Freytag commanded the Hanoverian troops and the 13,000–15,000-man Austro-Hanoverian corps under Duke of York in the Flanders Campaign in 1793, seeing action at Raismes (St. Amand) on 8 May, Famars on 23 May, the Siege of Valenciennes from 13 June to 28 July, and Cæsar's Camp 7–8 August.

In the Siege of Dunkirk he commanded the left-wing covering column. On 6 September he was driven back by Houchard at the Battle of Hondschoote, where he was wounded and captured, but rescued the following day by Wallmoden's counterattack.
He resigned soon after, due to poor relations with the Duke of York and was replaced by Wallmoden. Freytag died on 2 January 1798 in Hanover.

== Assessment ==
He knew the Duke of York from when the prince studied in Hanover in the 1780s. Relations between the two were seriously strained right from the beginning of the campaign. At St. Amand on 1 May, York tried to locate him and Bussche to bring their troops forward,

but found neither at home, because they too had ridden out to reconnoitre, which annoyed the Duke very much, because he had expected to find them in their quarters. The Duke then went to Rüme, but first ordered the Light Dragoons to advance. The Field Marshal, however, forbade their marching, and it was only after fresh orders that they set out, but arrived too late… The Field Marshal declined to sit by the Duke at his table that day, and left before the joints were served [...].

Fortescue claims that his 34-kilometre (21 mi) front in advance of Hondschoote was badly chosen, stamped him as a believer in the cordon system, and that a shorter front around the village would have been better. But Burne persuasively challenges this by citing five reasons for the weakness of Hondschoote:

it is difficult to see on what grounds Fortescue asserts that ‘the position at Hondschoote would have covered the besiegers quite as efficiently and with less risk’. In my opinion Freytag occupied the best possible position; his mistake was that he was forgetful of the principal of maintenance of the objective – namely, to cover the besieging army – till pulled up sharply and rightly by the Duke... The fact that even without the Duke's aid Freytag very nearly held up the French is a clear indication that with it the victory would almost certainly have gone to the Allies [...].

The Duke of York criticised his actions in the battle thus:

On the 6th of September, the day of the first attack upon the Field Marshal’s Corps, He never would believe that the Enemy had forced the post on His left and turned His left flank in spite of repeated reports that were sent to Him, nor was it till six in the evening, that he consented to retreat, which he did in two Columns. Instead however of sending the Artillery and baggage with General Count Walmoden's Column which was the furthest from the Enemy, He chose to take them in the rear of His own Column. I shall not touch upon the subject of His and my brother Adolphus’s being taken prisoners. I do not imagine there can be two opinions on the subject. I will only say that in consequence of this misfortune, everything would have been lost if it had not been for the presence of mind and coolness of Count Walmoden [...].

== Sources ==
- Burne, Alfred (1949). The Noble Duke of York: The Military Life of Frederick Duke of York and Albany. London: Staples Press.
- Fortescue, John (1918). British Campaigns in Flanders 1690–1794 (extracts from Volume 4 of A History of the British Army). London: Macmillan.
- Miniature Wargames (83).
- Ompteda, C.F. In the King's German Legion. Memoirs of Baron Ompteda, Colonel in the King's German Legion During the Napoleonic Wars.
