= Battle of Emsdorf =

1760 battle during the Seven Years' War

- Part of the Seven Years' War
Date	16 July 1760
Location	Emsdorf, Hesse (present-day Germany)
Result	Anglo-Hanoverian victory

Belligerents
Great Britain (Province of Hanover) Hanover; Hesse-Kassel	France

Commanders and leaders
Friedrich, Hereditary Prince of Hesse-Kassel	Baron von Glaubitz

Strength
3,000	3,000

Casualties and losses
186	2,600

The Battle of Emsdorf was fought on 16 July 1760 during the Seven Years' War at Emsdorf in present-day Hesse, Germany, between forces of British, Hanoverian and Hessian troops under the Prince of Hesse-Kassel (or Hesse-Cassel) against German troops in French service under Marechal de Camp von Glaubitz. It was part of the campaign to disrupt the French line of communications by capturing Marburg, a French supply depot.

The Anglo-Hanoverian force consisted of six Hanoverian and Hessian infantry battalions, some Hanoverian jägers, Luckner's light cavalry hussars and the British 15th Light Dragoons. The French force consisted of five infantry battalions from the German regiments of Royal-Bavarière and Anhalt, a regiment of hussars and some light troops.

The British forces initially surprised the French force in camp as they sat down to lunch. The French hussars fled at the onset while two of the infantry battalions managed to form up before receiving the concentrated fire of the Hessian battalions. Glaubitz sent one battalion back to Marburg while he tried to withdraw to Kirchhain with the rest of his troops. Most of the escape routes were cut by Luckner and the light troops. The Anglo-Hanoverians ultimately captured over 1,650 prisoners, mostly due to several charges by the British 15th Light Dragoons into the retreating French force.

The victory was largely won by the well-handled British 15th Light Dragoons who suffered heavily with 125 of the 186 Allied casualties. Lieutenant Colonel William Erskine of the 15th Dragoons presented King George III with 16 colours captured by his regiment after the battle. However, the objective of capturing Marburg was not achieved.

The Battle of Emsdorf was also the first ever Battle Honour awarded. Earlier battles were then given the status of a Battle Honour.
