= Breeders' Cup trophies =

The Breeders’ Cup Trophy is an authentic and totally faithful bronze reproduction of the Torrie horse. The original was created in Florence, Italy by Giovanni da Bologna, around the late 1580s. Each year the Breeders' Cup World Thoroughbred Championships award to the winner of each of 14 races a garland of flowers draped over the withers of the winning horse and four Breeders' Cup Trophy presented to the connections of the winners.

"Breeders' Cup Trophy" is presented to the winner of every Breeders' Cup race

== Early history ==
The horse is an ecorche, showing the muscles of the animal in detail. Its original purpose is unknown, but it may have been made as a study for the equestrian statue of Duke Cosimo I of Florence, cast in 1591. It has stood in the Piazza della Signoria in Florence since that date. The ecorche character gives the sculpture clarity and precision, combined with the grace and beauty of the living animal. This is evidence of a scientific as well as an artistic intention on the part of the artist and reveals the importance to him of the influence and example of Leonardo da Vinci. The most recent monumental equestrian sculpture in Florence, before that of Duke Cosimo I, had been Leonardo’s never-completed monument to Giangiacomo Trivulzio. The Torrie horse bears a close relationship to several drawings by Leonardo related to this project in the collection of Her Majesty the Queen at Windsor.

Other artists, too, knew and learned from Leonardo’s study of the horse, but none came so close as Giovanni da Bologna to his vision of the beauty of the animal celebrated by art and science together. The original ecorche bronze horse of Giovanni da Bologna is part of the University of Edinburgh Fine Art Collection in Scotland. The Edinburgh horse was acquired by Sir James Erskine of Torrie from the Villa Mattei in Rome, Italy in 1803. He bequeathed it to the University of Edinburgh with the rest of his collection of old master paintings and bronzes, and it came into the possession of the university in 1836.

== Current History ==
The Breeders’ Cup Trophy was cast from the original and was directly supervised and approved by the University of Edinburgh for the exclusive use of Breeders’ Cup Limited. The largest version of the trophy is permanently owned by the Breeders’ Cup Ltd, which displays it annually at the World Throughbred Championships venue. Replicas are presented to the owners of the winners of each of the Breeders’ Cup World Championships races every year. The breeders, trainers and jockeys of each winning horse also are presented with replicas of the Breeders’ Cup Trophy.

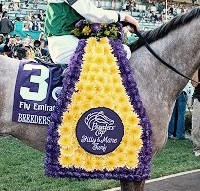
Breeders Cup Blanket & Bouquet is draped over the winner of each Breeders' Cup race winner.

In 1984 equestrian sculptor Irene French of Dorset, England was commissioned to sculpt an 11 inch high replica of the ‘Torrie Horse’. She completed this commission in 6 weeks. It was then cast in bronze by the Morris Singer Bronze Foundry of Basingstoke, England. This became the trophy for the American Breeders Cup, awarded annually to the winners of each of the Breeders Races. The Torrie bronze was thought to have been used to teach equine anatomy in the Middle Ages. It is said that the artist George Stubbs used the classic stance of the Torrie Horse to best display the muscles in his famous equine anatomical drawings.

== Blanket of Flowers ==
Following a century-old tradition, many of this country's high grade one races award of a blanket of flowers draped over the withers of the winning horse. In the Breeders' Cup all 14 division races are adorned with this tradition.

The Official Flower Garland Provider of the Breeders’ Cup is Kroger Floral Design Center, located in Louisville, Kentucky, it creates each of the 14 Championship race garlands.

The official blanket of flower garland is made of the rare combinations of Beauty Asters, Golden Asters, Cremons and Catteleya Orchids, which are grown exclusively for the Breeders’ Cup. The Kroger Floral Design Center has created the garlands since 1988. They have silk replicas of the official Breeders’ Cup flower garland, at the Breeders’ Cup Racing Office at (859) 514-9422.

Each blanket has two wide saddle bag ends in an elongated pentagon shape that are adorned with a large purple circle emboldened with the Breeders' Cup logo and an embroidered script with the name of the race that was just won. The blanket is narrowed in the middle at the neck for ease of display over the horse and is topped with a full bouquet of both color Chrysanthemums with other floral embellishments. The blanket is 96" long from one end to the other.
