= Torrie Horse =

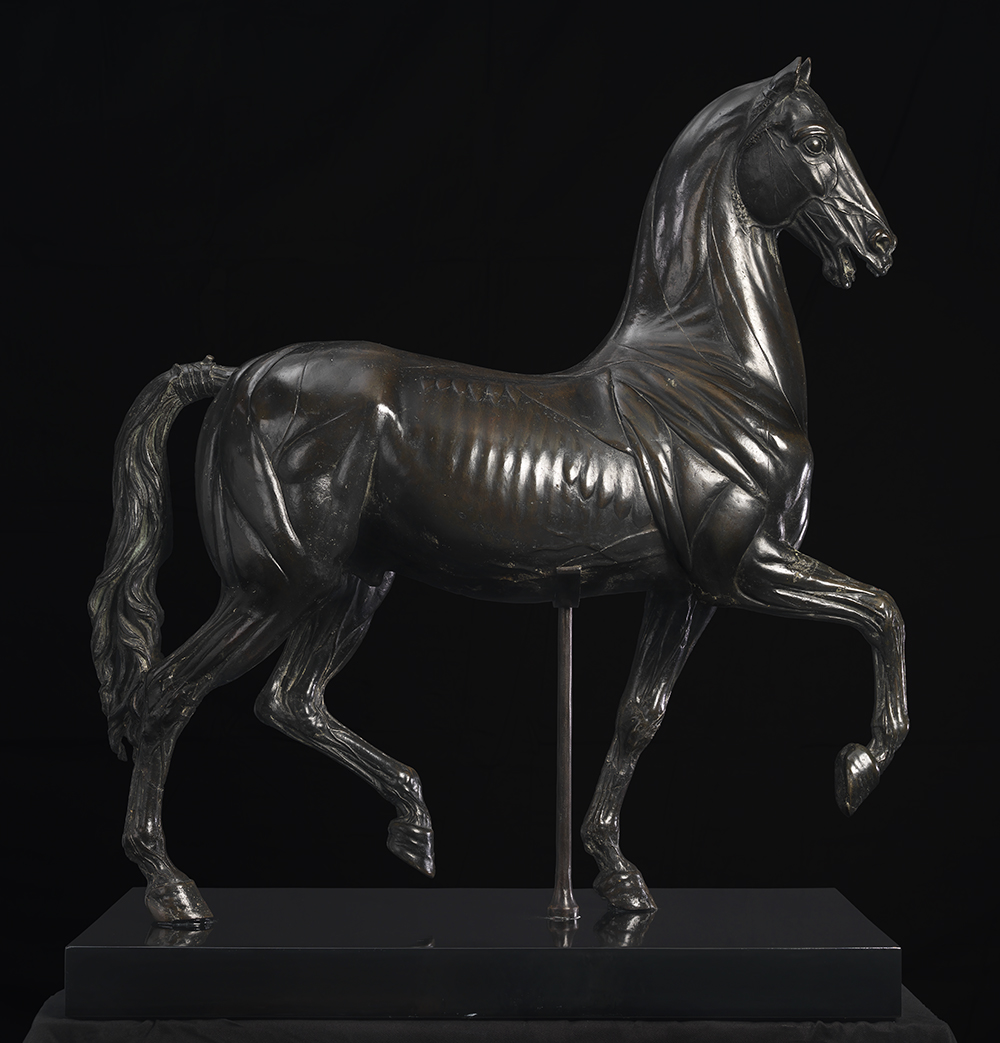
Torrie horse, Edinburgh

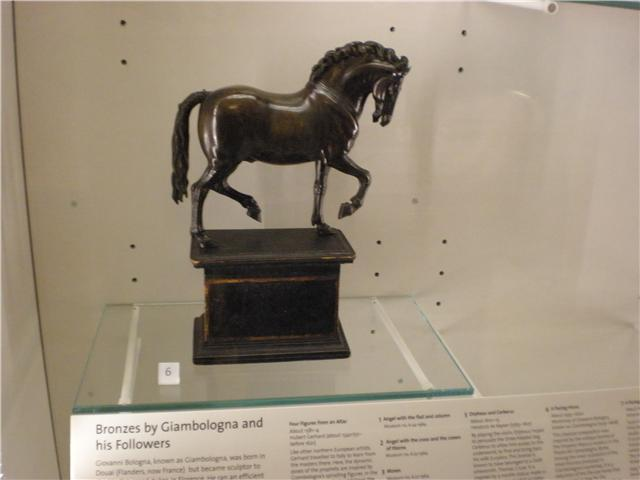
Giambologna, Pacing Horse

The Torrie Horse or Mattei Horse is a bronze Renaissance anatomical sculpture of a horse, created by Giambologna in Florence c. 1585.

The horse is depicted on two legs, with the right fore and left rear foot raised, perhaps at the trot. It is écorché (flayed) with the skin removed so the underlying musculature is clearly visible, and stands about 90 centimetres (35 in) high.

The sculpture may have been created as a preliminary a study for Giambologna's equestrian statue of Duke Cosimo cast in 1591 and displayed at the Piazza della Signoria in Florence. It is similar to Giambologna's statue of a pacing horse. It shows influence from some écorché drawings by Leonardo da Vinci, made for his uncompleted equestrian statue of Gian Giacomo Trivulzio, and resembles prints in Carlo Ruini's book, Anatomia del Cavallo. Some sources identify some inspiration from the ancient equestrian statue of Marcus Aurelius in Rome. The anatomical detail of the sculpture prefigures the intimate knowledge gained by George Stubbs from his own dissections.

The sculpture was displayed at the Villa Mattei in Rome in the 18th century. Pope Clement XIV refused permission for Giuseppe Mattei to sell it, along with other artworks from his collection, in 1770. It was later sold to Cardinal Fesch, and then sold from his collection in Paris in June 1816. It was acquired by Charles Loeser in London in 1913, and left to the Palazzo Vecchio in Florence on his death in 1928.

Copies of Giambologna's sculpture original were made at the Vatican foundry, by its directors Giuseppe Valadier and then Francesco Righetti. One of four known full size copies by Valadier was sold at Christie's in July 2013 for £1.4m; this sculpture may have been owned the Dukes of Northumberland before passing through the collection of Boris Kochno and Christian Bérard, and then Alexis von Rosenberg, Baron de Redé before being sold by Sotheby's in Monaco in 1975 for 1.5 million French francs.

A different example of the sculpture was acquired in Rome by James Erskine, later 3rd Erskine baronet of Torrie, around 1803, who attempted to sell it in London in 1804, and then brought it to Scotland. This sculpture is probably a copy by Valadier, as the original was still Cardinal Fesch's collection at the time. Erskine left his art collection, including the sculpture, to the University of Edinburgh on his death in 1836, and now held within the art collections of the University. Another example by Valadier is held by the Michele and Donald D'Amour Museum of Fine Arts, in Springfield, Massachusetts.

The University of Edinburgh veterinary school holds a more recent copy of the Edinburgh sculpture made by Mario Pastori in 1984. The Edinburgh sculpture was also copied to become the Breeders Cup trophy in the 1980s, with smaller replicas presented to the winners of Breeders' Cup World Championships races.

== See also ==
- Horses in art
