= Hondschoote =

Hondschoote Hondschote
- Commune
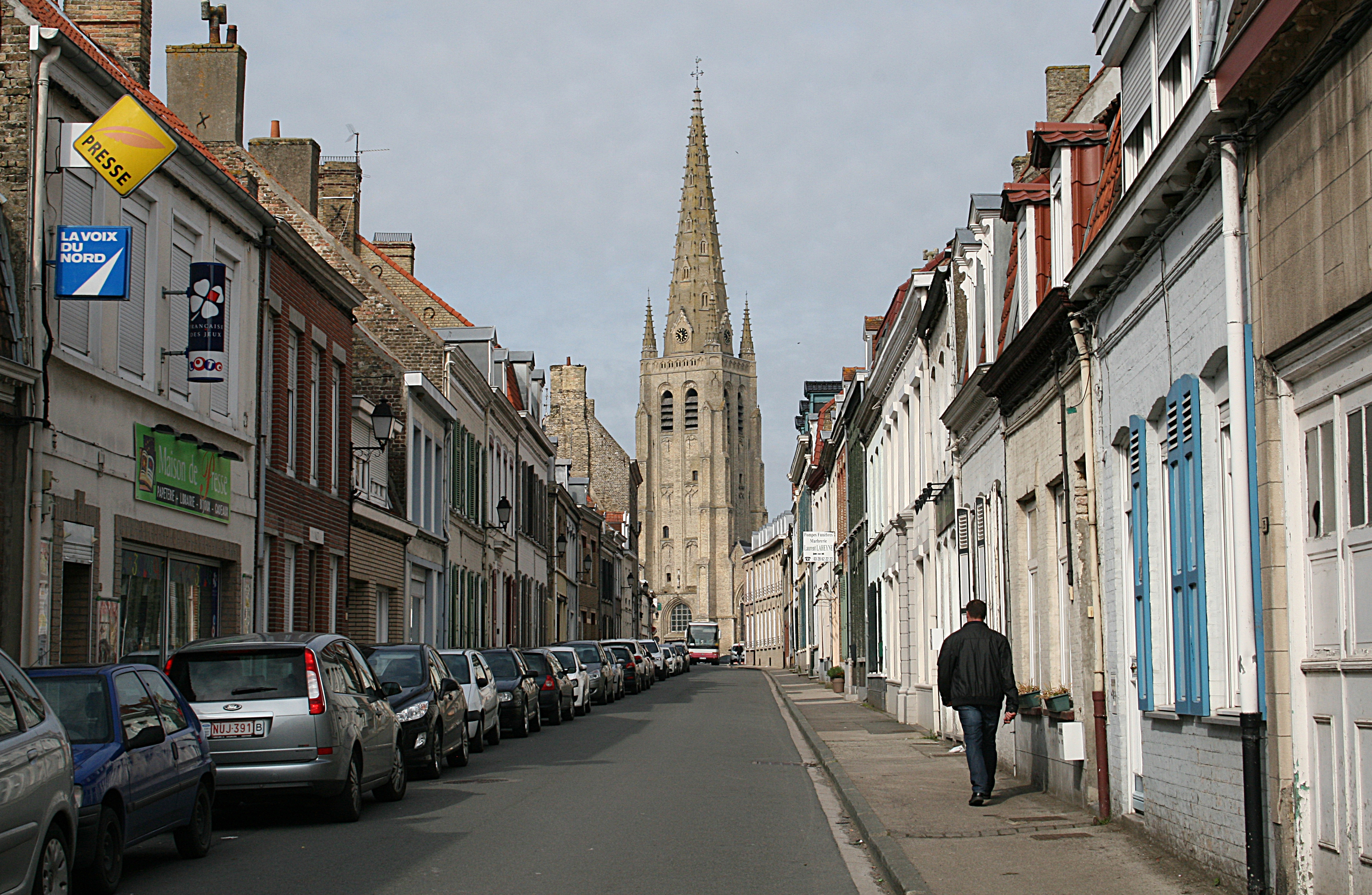
- Hondschoote

- Coat of arms
- Location of Hondschoote
- Location within France Location within Hauts-de-France
- Coordinates: 50°58′49″N 2°35′10″E
- Country: France
- Region: Hauts-de-France
- Department: Nord
- Arrondissement: Dunkirk
- Canton: Wormhout
- Intercommunality: CC Hauts de Flandre

Government
  - Mayor (2020–2026): Hervé Saison
- Area^{1}: 23.66 km^{2} (9.14 sq mi)
- Elevation: 5 m (16 ft)
- Highest elevation: 19 m (62 ft)
- Lowest elevation: 0 m (0 ft)
- Population (2023): 3,957
  - Density: 167.2/km^{2} (433.2/sq mi)
- Time zone: UTC+01:00 (CET)
  - Summer (DST): UTC+02:00 (CEST)
- INSEE/Postal code: 59309 /59122
- ^{1} French Land Register data, which excludes lakes, ponds, glaciers > 1 km^{2} (0.386 sq mi or 247 acres) and river estuaries.

Hondschoote (French pronunciation: [ɔ̃(t)skɔt]; from Dutch; Hondschote in the modern Dutch spelling) is a commune of the Nord département, in northern France.

== Geography ==
Hondschoote borders Flanders, the Dutch-speaking part of Belgium. It lies 12 km from the North Sea coast.

== Population ==
Historical population
Year	Pop.	±% p.a.
1968	2,722	—
1975	2,964	+1.22%
1982	3,716	+3.28%
1990	3,654	−0.21%
1999	3,815	+0.48%
2007	3,879	+0.21%
2012	4,072	+0.98%
2017	4,083	+0.05%
2023	3,957	−0.52%
Source: INSEE

== Sights ==
Hondschoote used to have several windmills, but only the Noordmeulen and the Spinnewyn survive. The church dates from the 14th century. Its tower was completed in 1513, burned during religious troubles in 1582 and restored in the early 17th century. The church is a surprisingly large building for this small town. On the square are several fine old buildings, particularly the town hall. The tourist office is a tiny structure near the front of the church.

== History ==
Before 1659, Hondschoote was part of the Spanish Netherlands. A thriving wealthy cloth-town, it had thousands of small workshops making serge cloth from locally grown flax. Events such as Beeldenstorm, conquest by France and the War of the Spanish Succession, however, brought an end to prosperity. The cloth-makers fled to what is now Belgium and England, taking their skills to benefit France's rivals.

The battle of Hondschoote in 1793 was a key event in saving the French First Republic from an invasion by English, Hanoverian and Austrian troops that had been sent in order to rid France of revolutionaries. During the battle, windmill Spinnewyn served as look-out post and first-aid station.

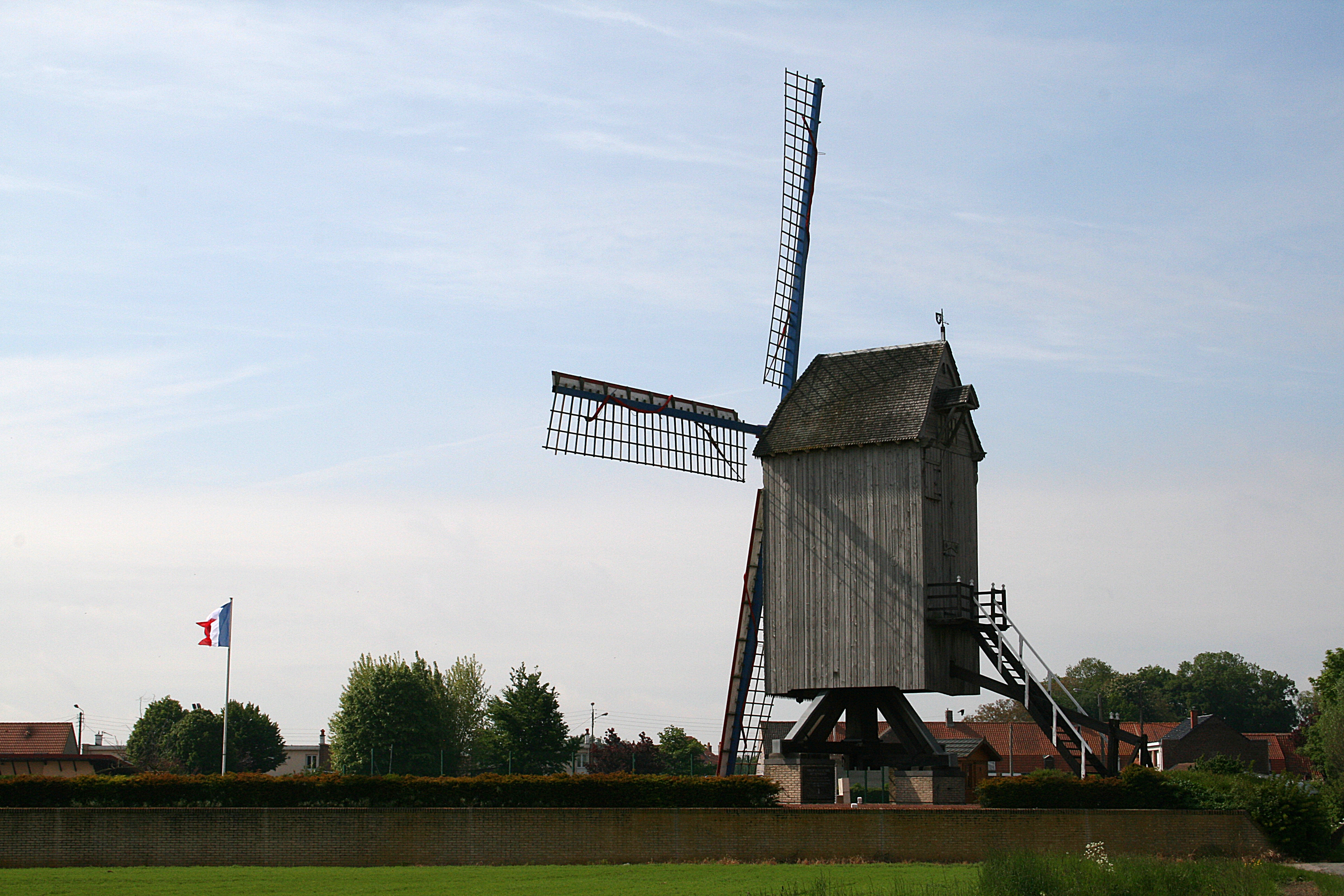
Hondschoote windmill.

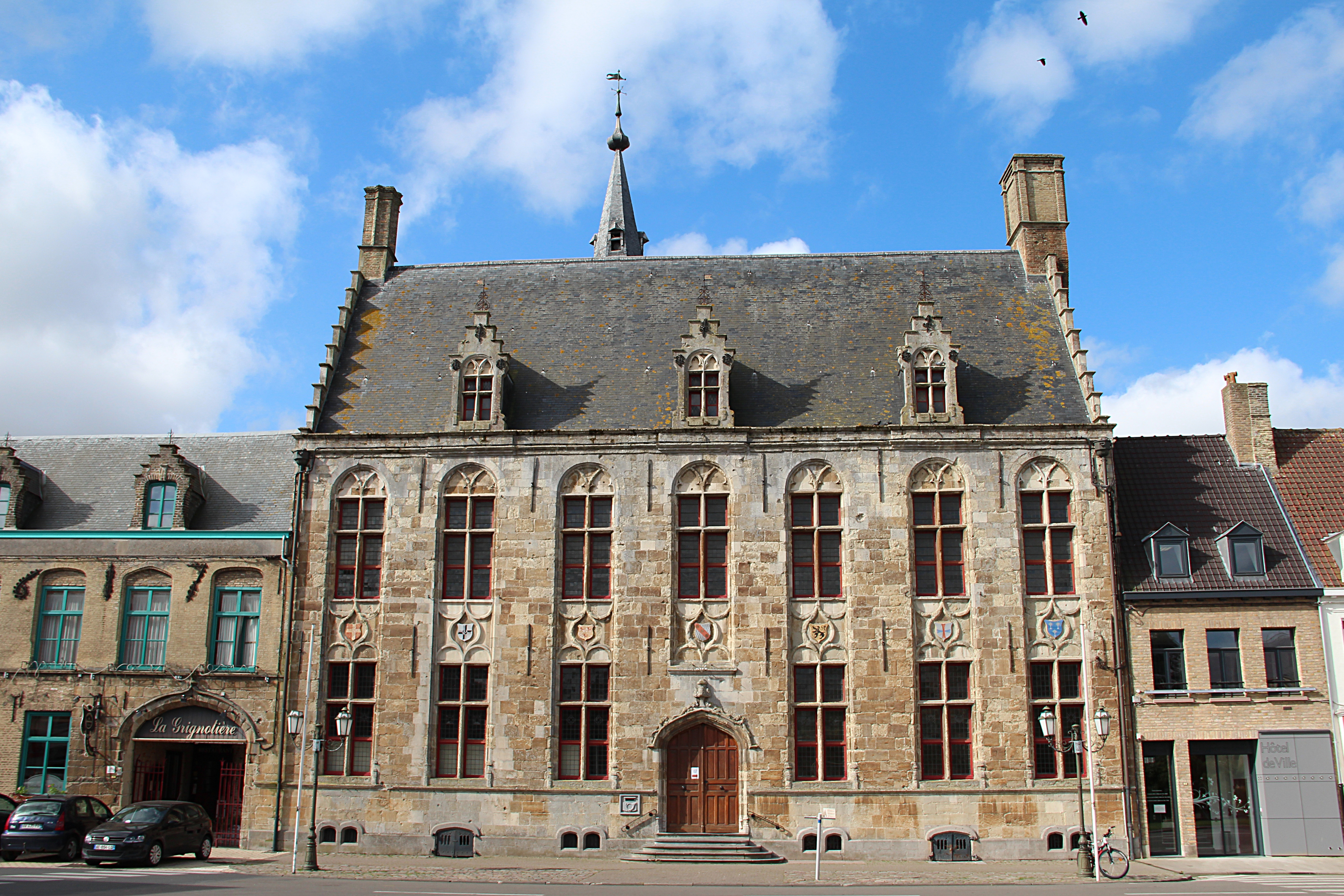
Town hall (16th century))

== Heraldry ==
Arms of Hondschoote	The arms of Hondschoote are blazoned : Ermine, on a bend gules, 3 escallops bendwise Or. (Ghyvelde and Hondschoote use the same arms.)

== Twin towns ==
- Osterburken, Germany

== See also ==
- Battle of Hondschoote
- Communes of the Nord department
