= Charles Cordiner =

Scottish Episcopal clergyman and antiquarian (1746–1794)

The Reverend Charles Cordiner
- Minister of St Andrew's Chapel, Banff
- Appointed: 1769

Personal details
- Born: c. 1746
- Died: 18 November 1794 (aged 48) Banff, Aberdeenshire
- Denomination: Scottish Episcopal Church

Charles Cordiner (c. 1746–1794) was a Scottish Episcopal clergyman and antiquary.

== Life ==
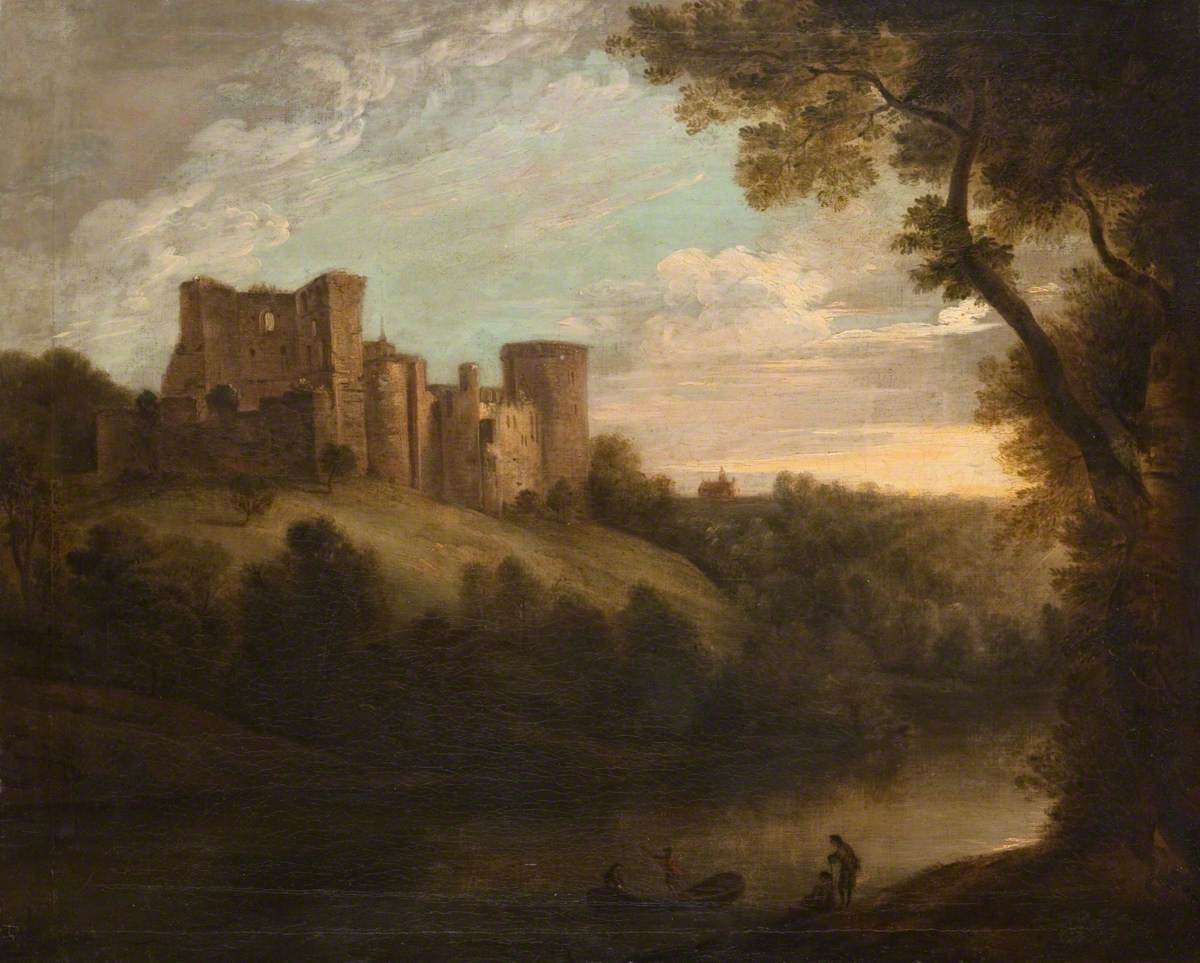
Bothwell Castle (c. 1760s)

Charles Cordiner became Episcopalian minister of St Andrew's Chapel, Banff, in 1769. He became known as a writer on antiquities. He died at Banff on 18 November 1794, aged forty-eight, leaving a widow and eight children. James Cordiner was his son.

== Works ==
He was the author of Antiquities and Scenery of the North of Scotland, in a series of Letters to Thomas Pennant, London, 1780; and Remarkable Ruins and Romantic Prospects of North Britain, with Ancient Monuments and singular subjects of Natural History, 2 vols. London, 1788–95. This last work, which is illustrated with engravings by Peter Mazell, was published in parts, but Cordiner did not live to see the publication of the last part.

== Gallery ==
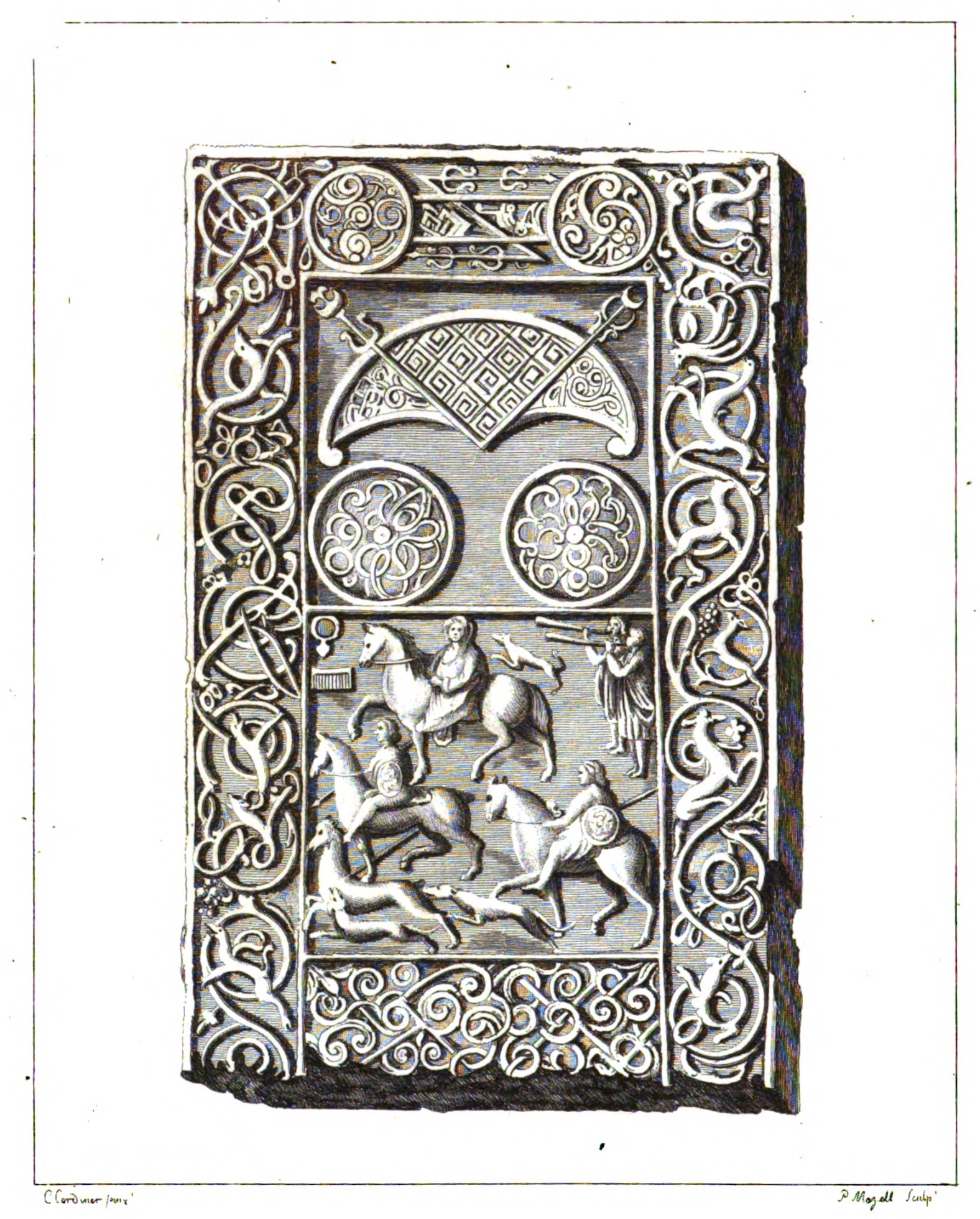
Hilton of Cadboll Stone

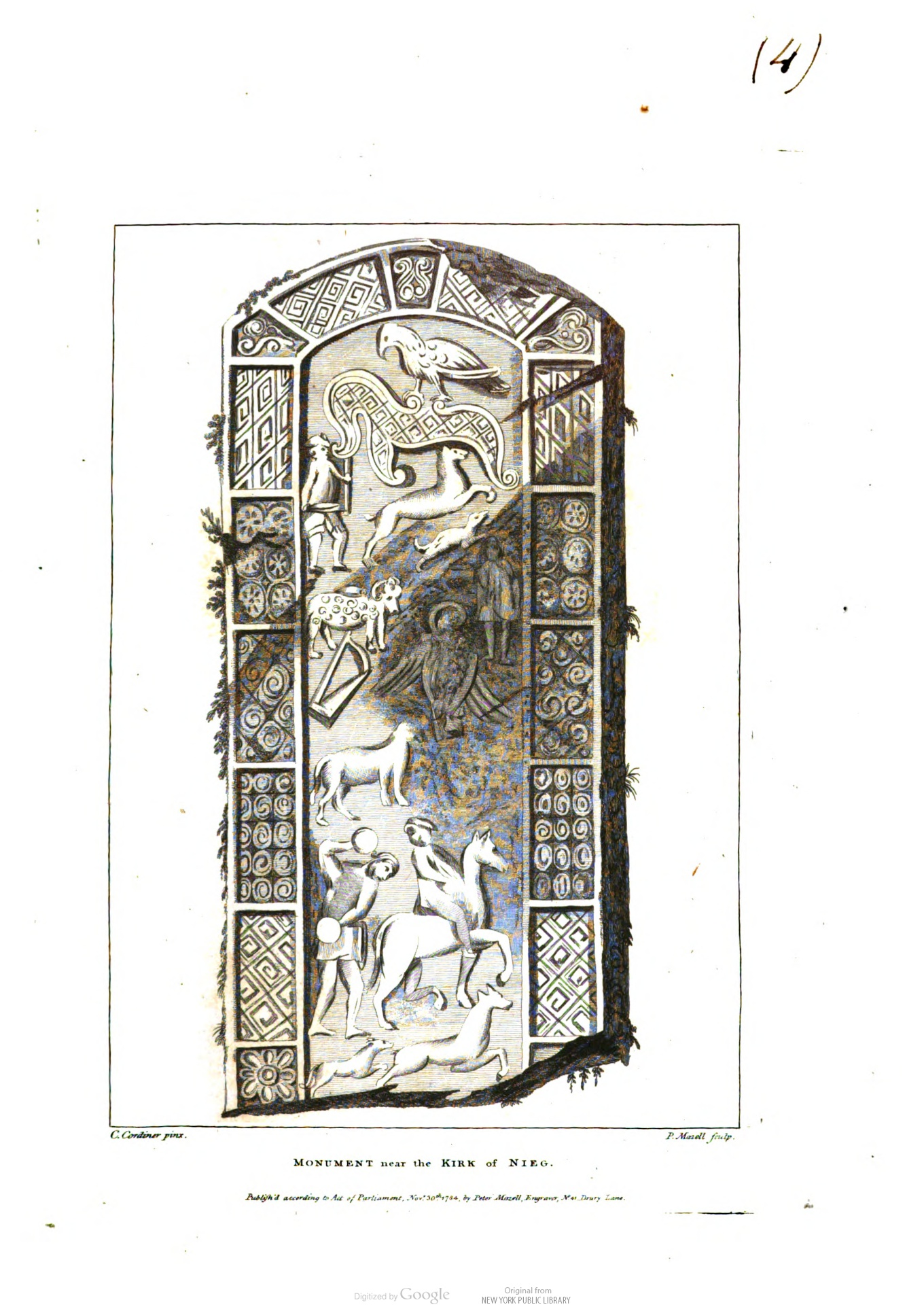
Nigg Stone
Remarkable Ruins and Romantic Prospects of North Britain, &c. (1788)

== Sources ==
- Smitten, Jeffrey R. (2004). "Cordiner, Charles (1746?–1794), Scottish Episcopal clergyman and antiquary". Oxford Dictionary of National Biography. Oxford UP. Retrieved 7 September 2022.

Attribution:

- This article incorporates text from a publication now in the public domain: Stephen, Leslie, ed. (1887). "Cordiner, Charles". Dictionary of National Biography. Vol. 12. London: Smith, Elder & Co. p. 215.
