= 80th Regiment of Foot (disambiguation) =

The 80th Regiment of Foot may refer to:

- 80th Regiment of Light-Armed Foot, raised in 1758 as an experimental light infantry force by Colonel Thomas Gage for service in the French and Indian War
- 80th Regiment of Foot (Royal Edinburgh Volunteers), raised in 1778
- 80th Regiment of Foot (Staffordshire Volunteers), raised in 1793
