= Martin baronets of Lockynge (1791) =

Escutcheon of the Martin baronets of Lockynge

The Martin baronetcy, of Lockynge in the County of Berkshire, was created in the Baronetage of Great Britain on 28 July 1791 for Henry Martin, Member of Parliament for Southampton. The title became extinct on the death of the 5th Baronet in 1910, leaving no heir.

== Martin baronets, of Lockynge (1791) ==
- Sir Henry Martin, 1st Baronet (1733–1794)
- Sir Henry William Martin, 2nd Baronet (1768–1842)
- Sir Henry Martin, 3rd Baronet (1801–1863)
- Sir William Fanshawe Martin, 4th Baronet (1801–1895)
- Sir Richard Byam Martin, 5th Baronet (1841–1910)

== Notes ==
Baronetage of Great Britain
| Preceded by Erskine baronets | Martin baronets of Lockynge; 28 July 1791 | Succeeded by Boughton-Rouse baronets |
