= Sir William Martin, 4th Baronet =

Royal Navy Admiral (1801–1895)

Admiral Sir William Martin Bt GCB
- Born: 5 December 1801
- Died: 24 March 1895 (aged 93) Winchfield, Hampshire
- Allegiance: United Kingdom
- Branch: Royal Navy
- Service years: 1813–1870
- Rank: Admiral
- Commands: HMS Fly; HMS Samarang; HMS Queen; HMS Trafalgar; HMS Prince Regent; Channel Squadron; Portsmouth Dockyard; Mediterranean Fleet; Plymouth Command
- Conflicts: Peruvian War of Independence
- Awards: Knight Grand Cross of the Order of the Bath

Admiral Sir William Fanshawe Martin, 4th Baronet, GCB (5 December 1801 – 24 March 1895) was a Royal Navy officer. As a commander, he provided valuable support to British merchants at Callao in Peru in the early 1820s during the Peruvian War of Independence. He became First Naval Lord in the Second Derby–Disraeli ministry in March 1858 and in that capacity acted as a strong advocate for the procurement of Britain's first ironclad warship. He went on to be Commander-in-Chief, Mediterranean Fleet and in that role provided important assistance during the Italian disturbances in 1860 and 1861, reformed the system of discipline in his fleet and developed a comprehensive system of manoeuvres for steam ships.

== Early career ==
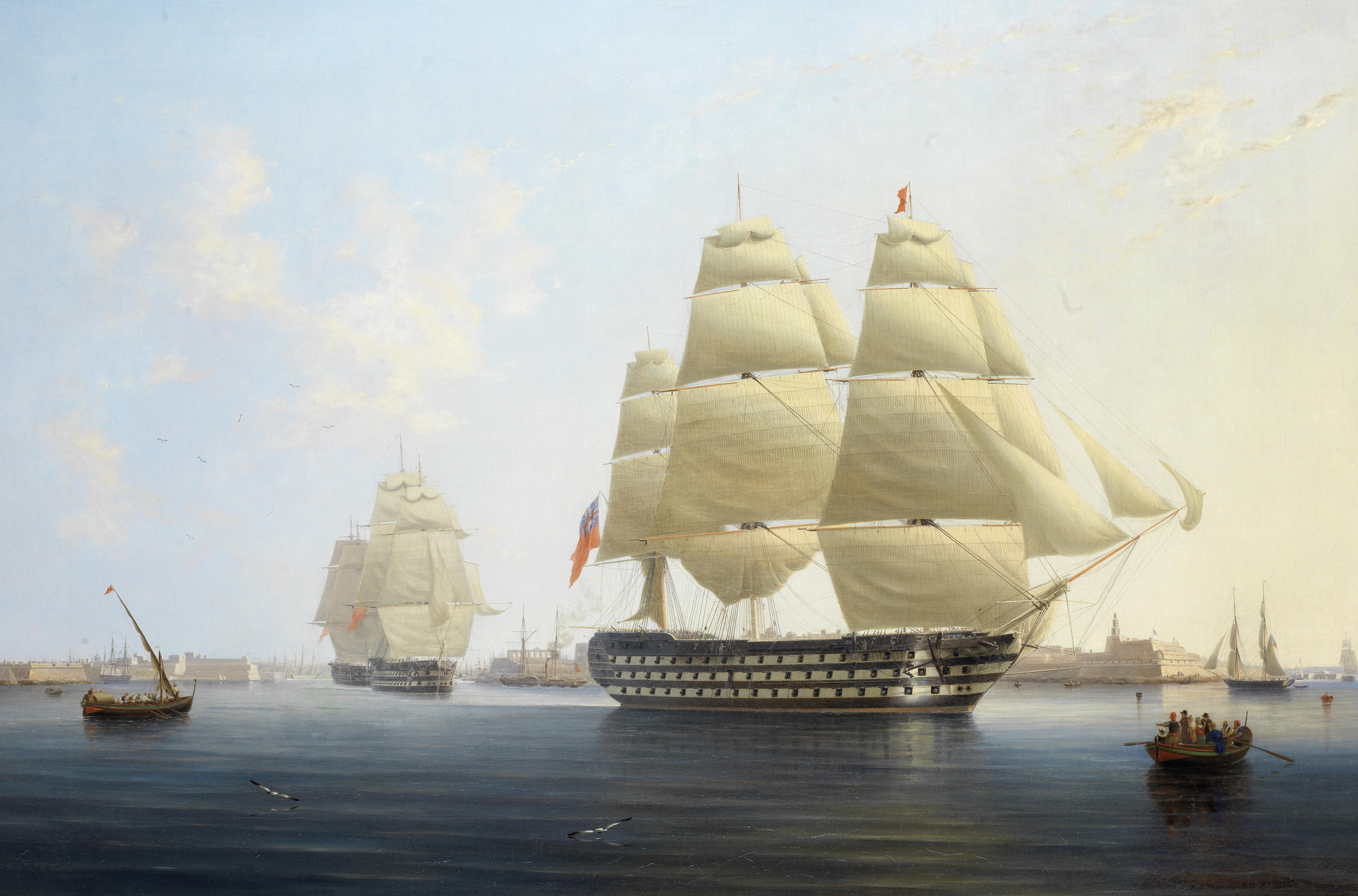
The first-rate HMS Queen which Martin commanded

Born the eldest son of Admiral of the Fleet Sir Thomas Martin (a former Controller of the Navy) and Catherine Martin (daughter of Captain Robert Fanshawe RN), Martin joined the Royal Navy in June 1813. He had two brothers, one of whom became Admiral Sir Henry Martin. He joined the fifth-rate HMS Alceste on the East Indies Station in January 1816 after which he transferred to the yacht HMS Prince Regent in 1820 and then to the fifth-rate HMS Glasgow in the Mediterranean Fleet. Promoted to lieutenant on 15 December 1820, he joined the fifth-rate HMS Forte and then the fifth-rate HMS Aurora on the South America Station. Promoted to commander on 8 February 1823, he was given command of the sloop HMS Fly on the South America Station and, in her, provided valuable support to British merchants at Callao in Peru during the Peruvian War of Independence.

Promoted to captain on 5 June 1824, Martin took command of the sixth-rate HMS Samarang in the Mediterranean Fleet in November 1826 and then went onto half-pay in 1831. He took command of the first-rate HMS Queen at Sheerness in July 1844 and then the first-rate HMS Trafalgar at Sheerness in January 1845 and finally the first-rate HMS Prince Regent in the Channel Squadron in December 1847. He went on to be commodore commanding the Channel Squadron with his broad pennant in HMS Prince Regent in December 1849.

== Senior command ==
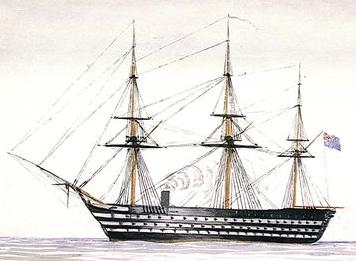
HMS Marlborough, Flagship of the Mediterranean Fleet, which Martin commanded in the early 1860s

Promoted to rear-admiral on 28 May 1853, Martin became Admiral Superintendent of Portsmouth Dockyard, hoisting his flag in the first-rate HMS St Vincent in November 1853. Promoted to vice-admiral on 13 February 1858, he became First Naval Lord in the Second Derby–Disraeli ministry in March 1858. In that capacity he acted as a strong advocate for the procurement of Britain's first ironclad warship.

Martin went on to become Commander-in-Chief, Mediterranean Fleet, hoisting his flag in the first-rate HMS Marlborough, in April 1860. In that role he provided important assistance during the Italian disturbances in 1860 and 1861, reformed the system of discipline in his fleet and developed a comprehensive system of manoeuvres for steam ships. Having been appointed a Knight Commander of the Order of the Bath on 28 June 1861 and promoted to full admiral on 14 November 1863, he succeeded to the baronetcy on 4 December 1863: this had been conferred on his grandfather, but passed to Martin upon the death of his cousin, Sir Henry, the 3rd Baronet. He went on to be Commander-in-Chief, Plymouth in October 1866 and was advanced to Knight Grand Cross of the Order of the Bath on 24 May 1873. He died at his home at Upton Grey near Winchfield on 24 March 1895.

== Family ==
Martin married on 24 July 1826 Honourable Anne Best, daughter of Lord Wynford. Following her death in 1836, Martin married on 21 May 1838 Sophia Elizabeth Hurt, daughter of Richard Hurt. Martin left five daughters and one son:

- Sir Richard Byam Martin (1841–1910), who succeeded as the 5th Baronet but died without issue when the title became extinct.
- Sophia Elizabeth Martin (died 27 Dec 1902)
- Caroline Matin
- Grace Martin
- Harriette Martin
- Georgiana Martin

== Sources ==
- William Loney RN Career History
- Laughton, John Knox (1901). "Martin, William Fanshawe" . In Lee, Sidney (ed.). Dictionary of National Biography (1st supplement). London: Smith, Elder & Co.
- Payson, W.P. (January 1900). "William Martin, Esq". The New England Historical and Genealogical Register. LIV (213). Boston: New England Historic Genealogical Society. OCLC 2564052.
- Starkey, P.; Starkey, J. (2001). Travellers in Egypt. London: Tauris Parke Paperbacks. ISBN 1-86064-674-3.

Military offices
Preceded by Sir Richard Dundas	First Naval Lord; 1858–1859	Succeeded by Sir Richard Dundas
Preceded by Sir Arthur Fanshawe	Commander-in-Chief, Mediterranean Fleet; 1860–1863	Succeeded by Sir Robert Smart
Preceded by Sir Charles Fremantle	Commander-in-Chief, Plymouth; 1866–1869	Succeeded by Sir Henry Codrington
Honorary titles
Preceded by Sir William Hope-Johnstone	Rear-Admiral of the United Kingdom; 1878–1895	Vacant Title next held by Sir Edmund Fremantle
Baronetage of the United Kingdom
Preceded by Henry Martin	Baronet (of Lockynge); 1863–1895	Succeeded by Richard Martin
