= Sir William Erskine, 1st Baronet =

British Army officer (1728–1795)

Lieutenant-General Sir William Erskine Bt
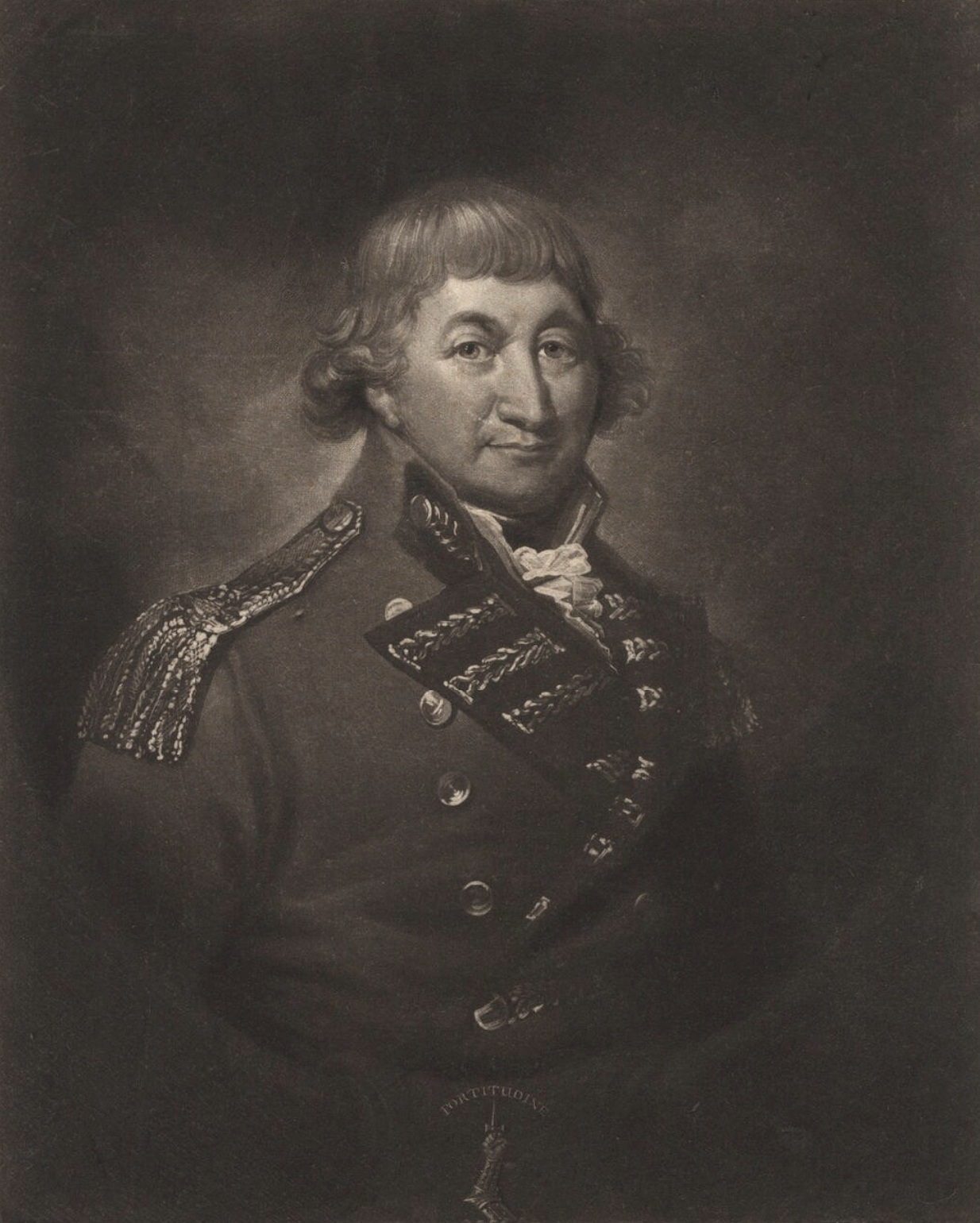
- Engraving of Erskine by Samuel William Reynolds after a Richard Cosway portrait
- Born: 1719; England
- Died: 19 March 1795 (aged 75–76)
- Military career
- Allegiance: Great Britain
- Branch: British Army
- Service years: 1742–1795
- Rank: Lieutenant-General
- Nickname: Woolly
- Commands: 15th Light Dragoons; 71st Regiment of Foot; 80th Regiment of Foot (Royal Edinburgh Volunteers); 26th (Cameronian) Regiment of Foot
- Conflicts: War of the Austrian Succession; Battle of Fontenoy; Seven Years' War; Battle of Emsdorf; American War of Independence; Battle of Long Island; Battle of the Assunpink Creek; Battle of Ridgefield; Battle of Monmouth; War of the First Coalition; Siege of Dunkirk (1793); Battle of Hondschoote; Battle of Tourcoing

Lieutenant-General Sir William Erskine, 1st Baronet (1728 – 19 March 1795) was a British Army officer who served in the Seven Years' War, American War of Independence and War of the First Coalition.

== Background ==
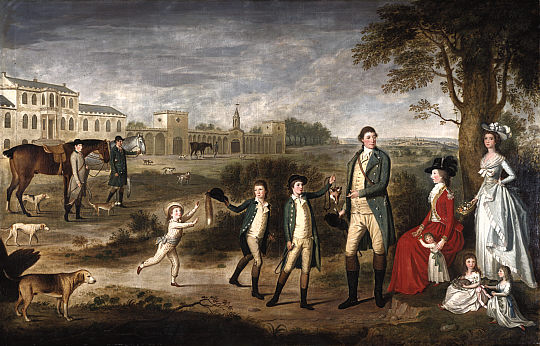
Portrait of Erskine with his family, by David Allan

Erskine was the son of Colonel the Honourable William Erskine of Torrie, Deputy Governor of Blackness Castle, Linlithgowshire, and grandson of David Erskine, second Lord Cardross.

Erskine first married Magdalen Myrton, daughter of Robert Myrton of Gogar, and then Frances Moray, daughter of James Moray of Abercairny.

His eldest son by his second wife, Frances, William, the 2nd baronet was a cavalry officer who committed suicide in Lisbon, Portugal in 1813 after a mental breakdown. He had another son, James, who was an officer in the 133rd (Fraser's) Foot, and became baronet on his elder brother's death. His third son John, also became baronet, on the death of his brother James.

Erskine joined his father's regiment the 7th Dragoons in 1742 and served in the War of the Austrian Succession, seeing action at the Battle of Fontenoy, then in the Seven Years' War. By March 1759 he was in Germany with the rank of major in the 15th Light Dragoons, and was promoted lieutenant-colonel commanding the same regiment in 1762. Erskine performed exceptionally on the field at the Battle of Emsdorf and was able to present King George III with 16 colors captured by his regiment. For his prowess, Erskine was knighted.

== American War of Independence ==
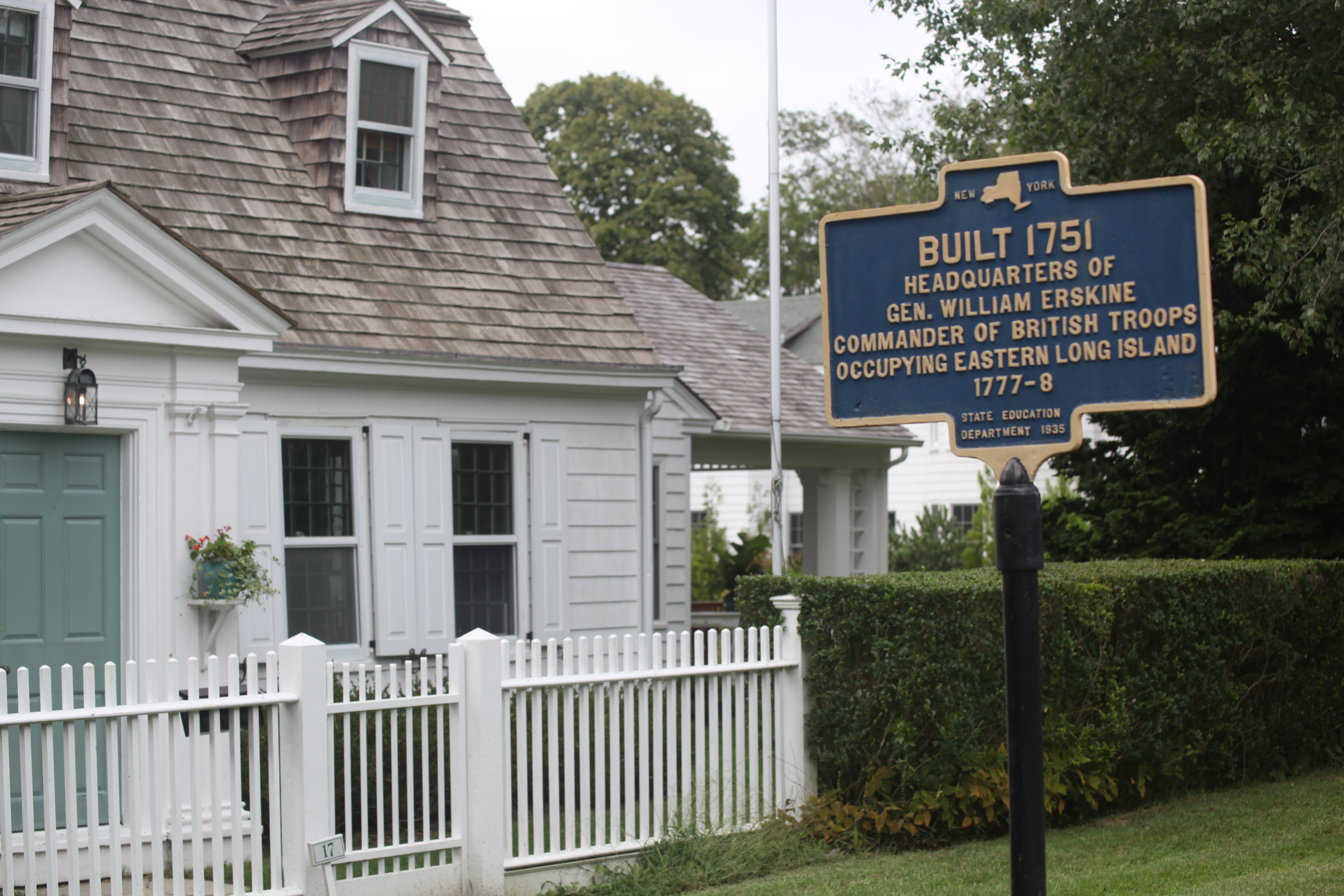
The Erskine House in Southampton, New York that served as Erskine's headquarters on Long Island in 1777–78.

Erskine was posted to America in 1776 as a brigadier staff officer under Clinton, seeing action in the New York campaign and commanding the 7th Brigade at Long Island 27 August 1776. In 1777 he was quartermaster-general to Lord Cornwallis. Erskine is credited with advising Cornwallis on the occasion of the Battle of the Assunpink Creek (also known as 'Five Mile Run') not to put off attacking the Continental Army on the night of 2 January 1777. The Continental forces moved away by night, fighting the Battle of Princeton on 3 January.

Erskine was made colonel of the 80th Foot on 4 March 1777. Now a brigadier-general, Erskine accompanied British forces as second in command under General William Tryon with the assistance of General James Agnew on an inland raid against Patriot supply depots in Danbury, Connecticut. After successfully destroying Patriot supplies, the British forces engaged and defeated Continental Army generals David Wooster, Benedict Arnold, and Gold S. Silliman and Patriot militiamen in the Battle of Ridgefield. Erskine served in the Philadelphia campaign and then, following Sir William Howe's resignation in 1778, continued as quartermaster-general under Henry Clinton. Erskine went on to lead troops at the Battle of Monmouth and after that campaign was given command of the eastern district of Long Island. Erskine's last active duty in North America was commanding five infantry battalions and a cavalry squadron in pursuit of the Continental Army which was thought to be moving to Virginia in November 1778. Promoted major-general on 19 February 1779, Erskine sailed for London the same year.

== Wars of the French Revolution ==
Erskine became colonel-in-chief of the 26th Foot (Cameronians) in 1782. On 28 September 1787 he was promoted lieutenant-general. He became a baronet in 1791. After the declaration of war with revolutionary France, he served on the staff of the Duke of York in the Flanders Campaign from late 1793. He was present with York at the Siege of Dunkirk from 25 August to 10 September, and commanded the retreat to Furnes after the Battle of Hondschoote. Erskine was given command of the army during York's absence through the Winter of 1793/1794.

At the opening of the spring campaign, he was given command of York's right wing in April 1794. He drove the French from Prémont on 16 April, but was unable to join York to complete the victory at Vaux. He commanded a column sent by Coburg to reinforce Clerfayt after the French breakthrough on 26 April, then commanded a 16-squadron cavalry reserve under York at the Battle of Tourcoing on 17–18 May. He again fought at Tournai soon after. Erskine commanded the 2nd (British) Line Corps in August.

Erskine died on 19 March 1795, aged 67, and is buried at Torryburn, Fife.

In the army he was nicknamed "Woolly" Erskine.

Military offices
Preceded by Lord Adam Gordon	Colonel of the 26th (Cameronian) Regiment of Foot; 1782–1795	Succeeded by Hon. Charles Stuart
New regiment	Colonel of the 80th Regiment of Foot (Royal Edinburgh Volunteers); 1777–1783	Succeeded by John Leland
Baronetage of Great Britain
New creation	Baronet (of Torrie); 1791–1795	Succeeded by William Erskine
