= 133rd (Highland) Regiment of Foot =

Infantry regiment in the British Army

The 133rd (Highland) Regiment of Foot (Inverness Volunteers) was a Scottish infantry regiment in the British Army, created in 1794 and disbanded in 1795. The regiment was raised in northern Scotland by Simon Fraser, and did not see any active service; it served solely to recruit soldiers. On disbandment, the recruits were drafted into other regiments.
