= Battle of Hondschoote =

1793 battle during the War of the First Coalition

- Part of the Flanders campaign in the War of the First Coalition
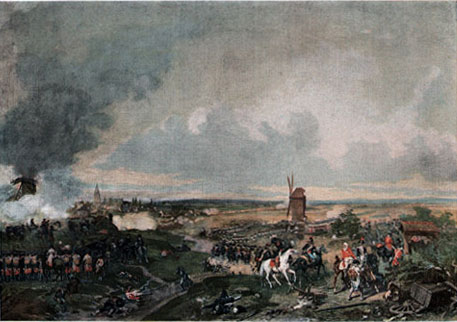
- The Battle of Hondschoote
Date	6–8 September 1793
Location	Hondschoote, French Republic 50.9803°N 2.5861°E
Result	French victory

Belligerents
French Republic	(Kingdom of Great Britain) Great Britain; Hanover; Hesse-Kassel

Commanders and leaders
Jean Nicolas Houchard; Jean-Baptiste Jourdan (WIA)	(Kingdom of Great Britain) Duke of York; Heinrich Wilhelm von Freytag (POW)

Strength
40,000	24,000

Casualties and losses
3,000 killed, wounded or captured	4,000 killed, wounded or captured
- Location within Europe

The Battle of Hondschoote took place during the Flanders Campaign of the Campaign of 1793 in the French Revolutionary Wars. It was fought during operations surrounding the siege of Dunkirk between 6 and 8 September 1793 at Hondschoote, Nord, France, and resulted in a French victory under General Jean Nicolas Houchard and General Jean-Baptiste Jourdan against the command of Marshal Freytag, part of the Anglo-Hanoverian corps of the Duke of York.

== Background ==
By August 1793, the Coalition Army under command of the Austrian Prince of Coburg had taken Condé, Valenciennes, and Le Cateau in Northern France. The Allies planned to next besiege Cambrai, however the British government ordered the Duke of York's Anglo-Hanoverian corps to instead seize the coastal port of Dunkirk, the possession of which they believed would be a valuable military base and bargaining counter. Its defences, manned by 8,000 men under the command of Joseph Souham, were thought to be in a poor state of repair and vulnerable to capture. York concentrated at Menen and split his command in two forces: 22,000 British troops he led directly to invest the city of Dunkirk, while the 14,500 man covering army of Marshal Freytag consisting of the Hanoverian troops and ten squadrons of British cavalry had to protect his left flank. The Duke of York drove Souham's men back into Dunkirk, taking the Rosendaël suburb on 24 August then digging in to besiege Dunkirk from the east side. The siege looked as though it might be a protracted affair, as York had neither siege artillery nor the manpower to properly surround the city.

Arriving at Poperinge on 20 August, Hessian troops under Freytag's command drove the French from Oost-Cappel and Rexpoëde back to Bergues. This fortified town was, two days later, surrounded by a corps moving south of Bergues and taking Wormhout and Esquelbecq. The corps was then spread in a thin military cordon. Its left lay at Poperinge, its right at Houtkerque. Freytag's command was split into a number of small outposts in the occupied villages. Freytag was an experienced commander and had seen much service in the seven years war commanding light troops, however at Hondschoote his trust in the cordon system of linked army outposts was to prove fatal.

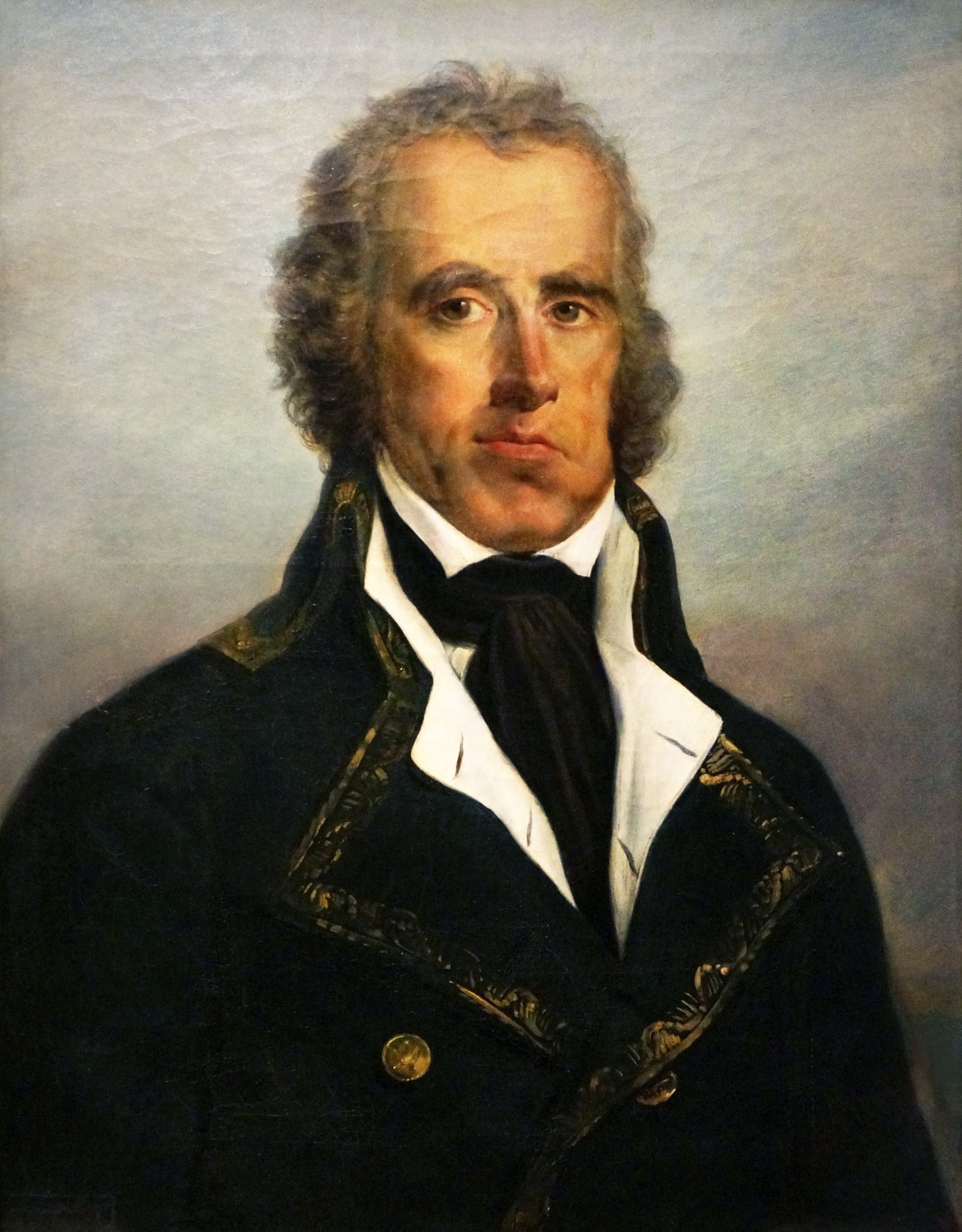
1836 portrait of Houchard

The new French commander of the Armée du Nord was Jean Nicolas Houchard, a brave and experienced subordinate general but patently out of his depth as Commander-in-Chief. Formerly one of Custine's closest deputies, he was in his element leading the charge of a cavalry regiment, but had neither the acumen or confidence to head an army the size of the Armée du Nord. Custine had prophesied that the command of an army would be "an evil present" to him, "Custine certainly could judge men, and he was right in this case, for all who knew the worthy old Houchard considered him as lost when given a charge so much beyond his powers". Paris was in the grip of the Reign of Terror, hanging over him was the spectre of suspicion, Custine himself was under arrest for failing in the field and would shortly die on the scaffold. Placed between the zealous harangues of the Représentant en missions and the inadequate condition of the rag-tag troops he commanded Houchard was acutely aware that the leadership of the 'Nord' could be a fatal command, and his confidence both in himself and his subordinates was greatly undermined. Houchard wrote on taking command "My life is poisoned... everywhere calumny has preceded me, everywhere I have suffered the last agony, since I have found nothing but distrust in all the persons who do not know me"

Nevertheless, following the Levée en Masse the troops under his command were being rapidly reinforced with new recruits. Lazare Carnot, newly elected to the Committee of Public Safety, had galvanised the command structure and had ordered a rapid concentration of forces south of Freytag's position. By 24 August, 20,000 men were in Cassel entrenched camp, 4,000 at Lille, and between 12 and 15,000 more were en route from the Moselle front. The Anglo-Hanoverians were aware that the French were strengthening their front and asked for reinforcements from Coburg, but the Austrians were tied down with the siege of Le Quesnoy. The only concessions made were for a corps under Beaulieu to be moved up to Bouvines and Orchies, while the lackluster Dutch troops of the Prince of Orange spread out between Lannoy to Menin. On 27 August Houchard launched 15,000 men in three columns against Orange and Beaulieu's forces towards Tourcoing and Menin. Macdonald's column was beaten back from Lannoy, and the same fate befell the command of Dumas at Lincelles. At Tourcoing, faced by Houchard's central column the Dutch abandoned the village after a stiff fight, but the French then dispersed to plunder, only to flee on the sight of two small bodies of enemy cavalry. Houchard had intended to threaten Menin, a determined attack through here would almost certainly have cut off the entire British corps, but confusion reigned in the French camp, Houchard lost 7 guns as he fell back due to his civilian artillery drivers cutting their traces, and the opportunity was missed.

== Battle of 6 September ==
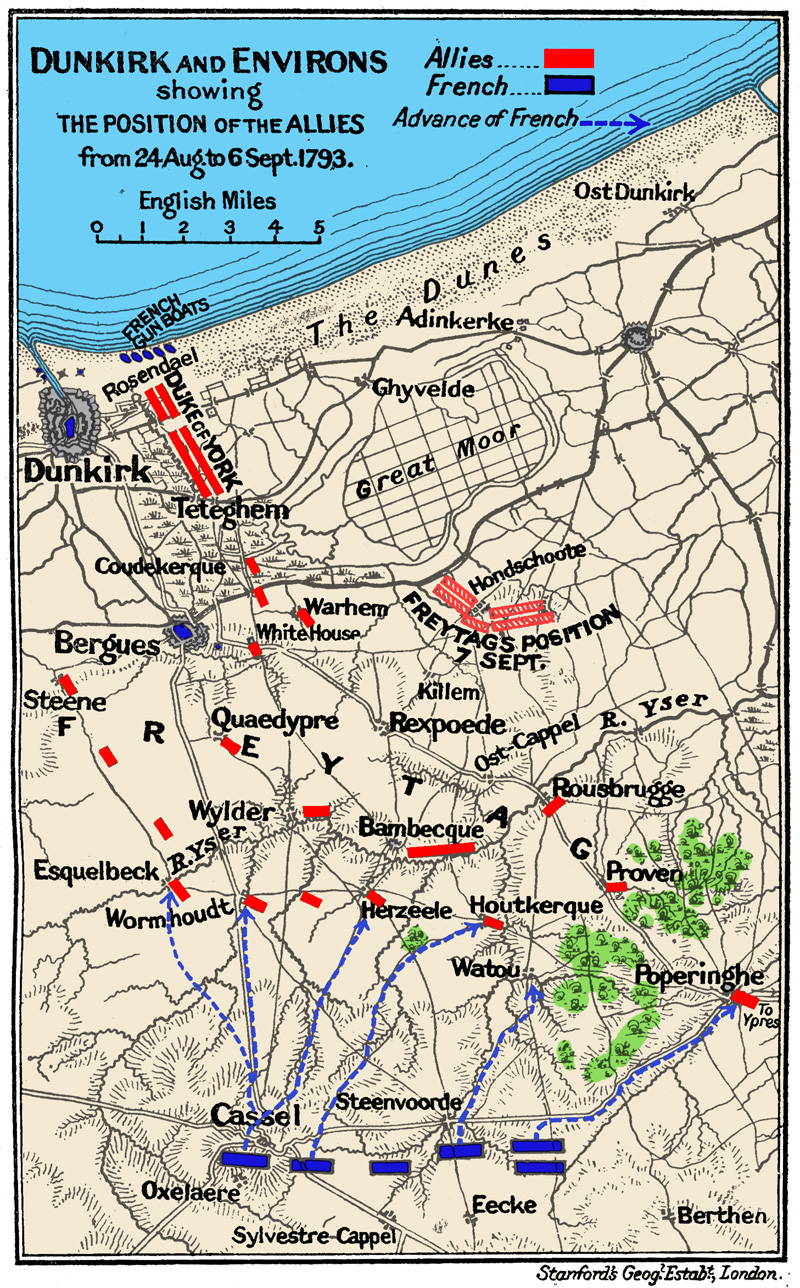
Positions on 7 September during the siege of Dunkirk and the Battle of Hondschoote

Having realised that York's objective was to besiege Dunkirk, Houchard saw his opportunity to drive a wedge between the Anglo-Hanoverians and the Austrians. However he had no intention of massing troops to strike a decisive blow, Houchard merely planned to use the concentrated forces at Cassel to demonstrate against York and draw him away from Dunkirk.

At the beginning of September Houchard learned of the execution of Custine in Paris, which sent him into a spiral of dejection and allowed the Representatives virtually a free hand. On the 5th reinforcements from the Rhine raised his forces at Cassel to 45,800 men. On the same day Freytag, fearful of the French build-up to his front, sent two detachments to seize Arneke, which was duly stormed, though a British colonel was taken prisoner. Houchard was probably aware that an enveloping attack against York's communications would be the most effective strategy, but under pressure from the Representatives, it was resolved instead to launch a direct attack on Freytag's thin line, spread out in detachments south of Dunkirk.

On 6 September Houchard's forces were poised in eight commands. On the right Dumesny (9,000 men) was at Bailleul. To his North-West lay Vandamme (4,500), while Hédouville (7,400) lay at Steenvoorde. Next was Jourdan's corps of 13,000 at the Cassel Camp. Slightly north of there on Cassel hill stood Landrin (6,000). Considerably further to the north Bergues was held by Leclaire with 6,000 men, and finally the Dunkirk garrison were to commit 6,000 in support. In total Houchard utilised some 51,000 men against York's 35,000 across an 18-mile front.

At daybreak on the 6th, 30,000 republicans erupted from these positions. Hédouville drove the defenders from Poperinge, while on his right Vandamme advanced with little resistance to Proven. They then took Rousbrugge, crossed the Yser and halted at Oost-Capel. On the left flank Landrin came up against severe resistance at Wormhoute. Further still to the left Leclaire (6,000) advanced from Bergues but was forced back by Freytag's right wing under Wallmoden.

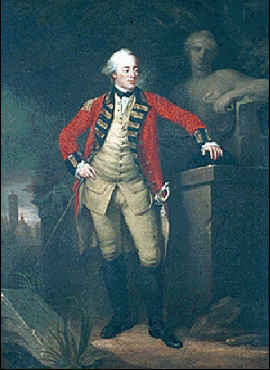
Johann Ludwig von Wallmoden

In the centre Colaud's brigade from Hédouville's column drove the defenders from Houtkerque, where he was soon joined by Houchard with Jourdan's Division. Houchard had planned to join Hédouville via Rousebrugge then march with both columns on Hondschoote, however on the insistence of his staff officer Ernouf he abandoned this plan and instead turned West for Herzeele, sending Colaud to Proven. Jourdan led the assault on Herzeele, which was quickly taken, and, encouraged by this success, Houchard then advance to cross the Yser and capture Bambecque.

Freytag's men withstood the assault bravely despite being vastly outnumbered and the fighting became very protracted, those facing Houchard and Jourdan behind the Yser held out at Bambecque all day, helped by a violent rainstorm. As French ammunition began to run low Jourdan wrote to Houchard to ask if they should halt, to which the Chief of Staff Berthelmy responded "we must conquer at any price; failing cartridges, are there not bayonets?". Eventually at 6.00 pm Bernadotte's regiment managed to ford the river and the Hanoverians withdrew from Bambecque. With his men exhausted and knowing Hédouville's column had also crossed the river at Oost-Capel Houchard wished to halt for the night, but Representative Hentz overruled him, announcing "Free men were never too tired to fight the slaves of tyrants; therefore the army should continue its movement". On they pushed to Rexpoede, which was seized by Jourdan with three battalions and a regiment of cavalry.

At 8.00 pm Freytag ordered a retreat to Hondschoote, sending orders for Wallmoden's command facing Bergues to join him there. Freytag led his men along the route via Rexpoede, unaware that the town had already fallen to the French, and the head of the column ran straight into the French outposts. After a confused scuffle Freytag was wounded and captured, together with the future Duke of Cambridge. The latter soon escaped, thanks to the help of his young Aide-de-Camp Scharnhorst, but Freytag remained a prisoner in French hands until Walmoden, who had suspected his commander could be in danger, arrived with his column at Rexpoede and retook the town, scattering Jourdan's three battalions and almost capturing Houchard in turn. The panic was so severe that some of the French, including Bernadotte's battalion, ran all the way back to Cassel.

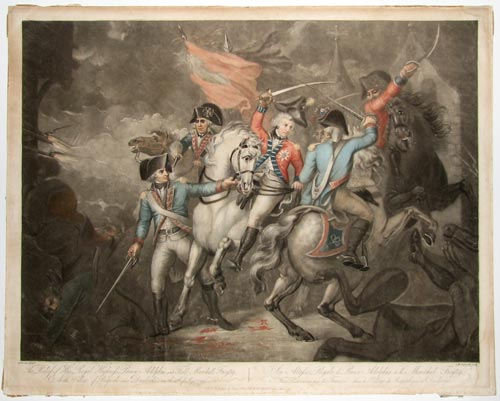
Freytag and Cambridge captured at Rexpoede

Walmoden then took command of the whole corps and fell back to Hondschoote, arriving there by 6.00 am on the 7th. He stationed his left on the village of Leysele, his centre in front of the town, and his right on the Bergues canal. His front was covered by a mass of hedges and ditches, the only passage was over a dyke leading into the town of Hondschoote, however despite being a great defensive position it denied the Hanoverians the use of their cavalry, in which they greatly outclassed the French. Walmoden urgently requested reinforcements from York, but due to the flooding of the fields around Dunkirk the only way troops could be sent was via Bergues.

== Attack of 8 September ==
The next day Houchard attempted to renew the assault, but Jourdan's troops in particular were scattered and demoralised after the hard fighting, so his forces were pulled back to the south bank of the Yser to reorganize and re-supply. However to his left Leclaire advanced once more from Bergues and met with Hédouville's column advancing from Oost-Capel. As night fell their commands lay at Rexpoede and Maison Blanche respectively. Behind them Landrin was at Wormhoudt, west of Houchard's own command at Herzeele. Further north Vandamme with his 4,400 men left Proven and advanced on Hondschoote via Rousbrugge and Oost-Capel, only to be driven back to towards Killem by Wallmoden.

As 8 September dawned the situation lay as: Walmoden was at Hondschoote with 13,000 men, faced by the three largely fresh columns of Vandamme, Leclaire and Hédouville, 17,800 in total. Behind them lay the spent remnants of Jourdan and Houchard's columns, some 13,000 strong, together with 6,000 fresh troops of Landrin. Further away at Bailleul lay 9,000 men under Dumesny. Thus Houchard's command was again spread out over a wide front.

Houchard decided to launch a three pronged assault on Hondschoote. On the French left Leclaire's column was to attack Hondschoote from the direction of Maison Blanche along the canal and the inundation. In the centre Houchard personally led the main attack with Jourdan's Division from Rexpoede flanked on its left by Vandamme from Killem and on the right Colaud's brigade detached from Hédouville's command, in total a column of 20 battalions directly along the dyke covered by artillery. Hédouville was directed to move north-west to Bergues then turn eastward to join the battle at Hondschoote. Landrin's column was sent to Dunkirk to help pin down the Duke of York. So, of his entire 43,000 men Houchard only utilised some 22,000 for the attack on Walmoden, while another 12,000 were sent to Dunkirk, and Dumesny's 9,000 men were left facing Ypres, far from the seat of action.

This scattering of his forces was a mistake that displayed Houchard's shortcomings as a commander, had he instead concentrated his attack against the Hanoverian left at Leysele rather than placed his main weight in the centre then Walmoden would inevitably have been forced to withdraw to protect his line of retreat. Nevertheless, tactics were on the side of the Republicans, the broken ground before Hondschoote was perfectly suited to the French use of loose skirmishers, Jourdan and Vandamme's men kept up a constant fire from the protection of the hedges which the Hanoverians had little answer to. After four hours of determined combat however, with the fighting at such close range the opposing troops were within stabbing distance the French in the centre were making no headway and were slowly being forced back. With the centre wavering Houchard rode out to bring up Colaud's brigade on the right, ordering Jourdan to attack again when he heard the charge sounded. As the French line began crumbling Jourdan brought forward his one remaining reserve battalion, hoping to use it as an anchor to lead an attack. Jourdan was slightly wounded in the chest, but at last Houchard's signal was heard and the attack went forwards. On the right Houchard led the charge at the head of the 17th Cavalry.

Having lost a third of their number, with their left seriously threatened by Hedouville and ammunition running short the Hanoverians were finally forced out of the town. Having fought against incredible odds and endured heavy losses Walmoden withdrew in two disordered columns to Furnes, covered by a Hessian battalion and his cavalry which prevented any French pursuit.

== Allied retreat ==
With news of his left flank exposed The Duke of York gave orders for his heavy baggage to be withdrawn to Furnes, while at a Council of War it was decided to lift the siege of Dunkirk. Souham had rendered the canal unusable for transport, so the heavy siege guns had to be abandoned. At midnight of the 8th York's corps began withdrawing to the coastal city of Furnes (now Veurne in Flanders-Belgium), where the next day he rejoined the rest of Walmoden's troops.

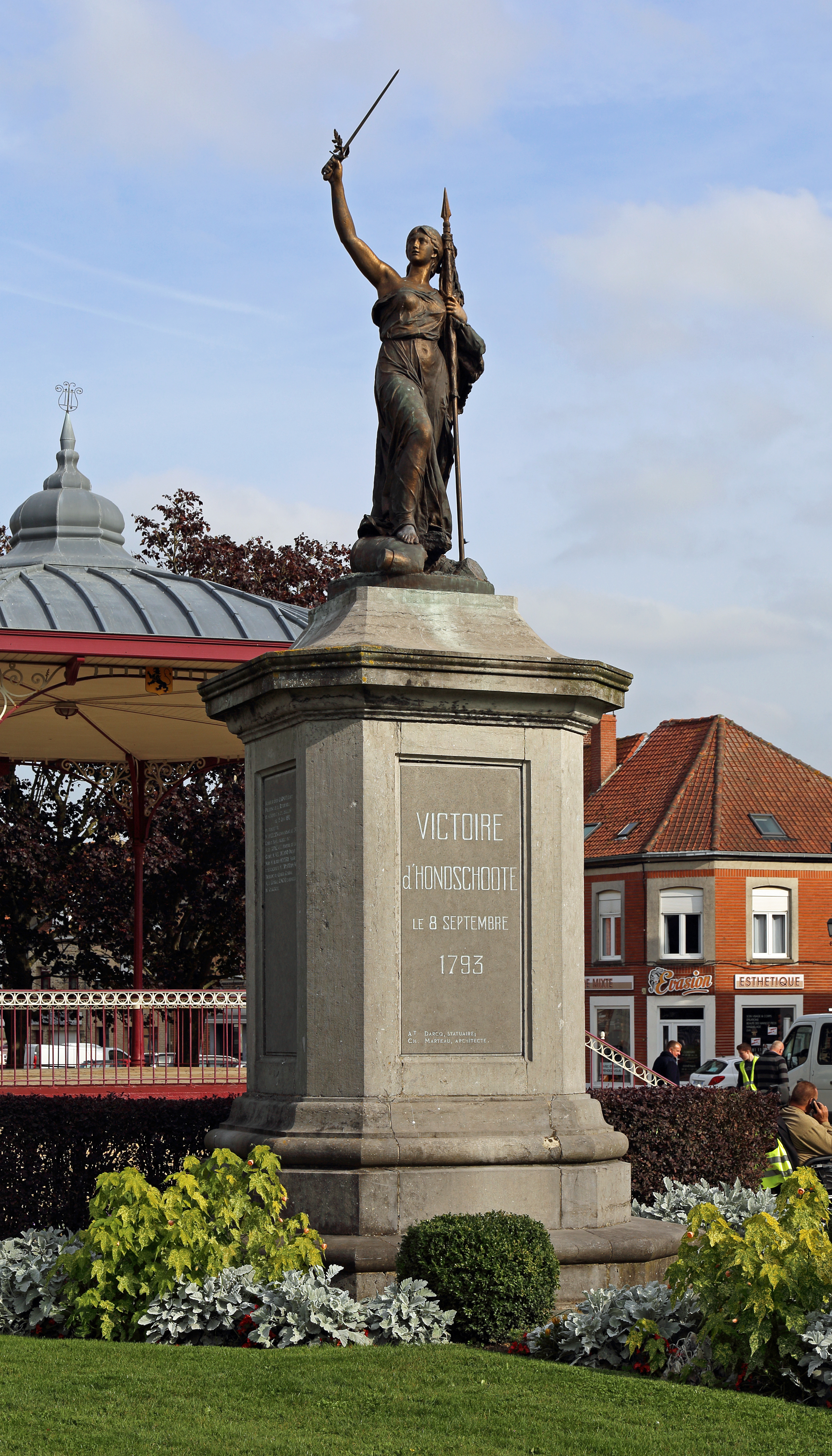
Hondschoote: monument commemorating the battle

There was no pursuit by Houchard, so York was able to extricate his command without interference from the French. Part of the reason was that the French were in complete confusion by the end of the action, however Hédouville's troops, who had been reconnoitering towards Bergues and taken no part in the action were available. Hédouville was in fact sent in pursuit, but he halted when he came to a broken bridge. Vandamme was given three cavalry regiments to cross a marsh and pursue York, some baggage was captured but nothing else.

Walmoden had lost 2,331 officers and men from his 9,000 infantry over the past few days fighting, including the Hessian General Cochenhausen, who was captured and later died of his wounds. Jomini suggests the French loss was about the same, but eye-witness Gay de Vernon estimates it as 1,800.

At Hondschoote, 30,000 French had defeated 14,500 Hessian and Hanoverian soldiers, capturing 6 flags and (as a consequence of the subsequent retreat) the Duke of York's 32 requisitioned naval siege guns. Despite his triumph however, Houchard was seen unsympathetically by the Representatives. Not only were they witnesses to his hesitations, he refused to throw his tired and disorganised men at Yorks orderly rearguard, telling the Representative bluntly he was 'not a military'. This was to prove fatal, for his failure to pursue York and stumbling command Houchard was later arrested on charges of cowardice, tried and guillotined.

== Assessment ==
Alfred Burne devotes several pages assessing the siege of Dunkirk and Hondschoote, including York's report, in which he made plain he felt Freytag was culpable. York writes of Freytag: "On the 6th of September, the day of the first attack upon the Field Marshal's Corps, He never would believe that the Enemy had forced the post on His left flank in spite of repeated reports that were sent to Him, nor was it till six in the evening, that he consented to retreat, which he did in two Columns. Instead however of sending the Artillery and baggage with General Count Walmoden's Column which was furthest from the Enemy, He chose to take them in the rear of His own Column."

On the conduct of the Anglo-Hanoverian force Burne challenges Fortescue's summary on several issues, pointing out that Fortescue did not have access to York's correspondence when he wrote his History. In particular he criticises Fortescue's assertion that Freytag should have taken position at Hondschoote from the beginning rather than the more advanced line, for reasons that Hondschoote was too narrow a front, too close to Furnes, the position lacked depth, it would have cut communication with York, and the terrain was unsuitable for cavalry. "In my opinion Freytag occupied the best possible position; his mistake was that he was forgetful of the principle of maintenance of the objective – namely, to cover the besieging army – till pulled up sharply and rightly by the Duke".

Preceded by Battle of Wattignies	French Revolution: Revolutionary campaigns Battle of Hondschoote	Succeeded by Siege of Bellegarde (1793)
