= 80th Regiment of Foot (Royal Edinburgh Volunteers) =

- Active: 1 May 1778–1783
- Country: Kingdom of Great Britain (1707–1800)
- Branch: British Army
- Type: Infantry
- Engagements: Yorktown

The 80th Regiment of Foot (Royal Edinburgh Volunteers) was a regiment in the British Army from 1778 to 1783.

It was formed in Edinburgh, Scotland by letter of service in 1778 for service in North America and sailed to New York commanded by lieutenant-colonel Thomas Dundas in 1779. The regiment then moved to Virginia, where they were captured at the Battle of Yorktown.

The regiment returned to Scotland to be disbanded in 1783.

== Colonels ==
Colonels of the regiment were:

- 1777-1782: Lt. Col Thomas Dundas of Fingask
- 1777–1783: Lt-Gen. Sir William Erskine of Torrie, Bt.
- 1783–1784: Gen. John Leland
