= John Mansel (British Army officer) =

British Army officer

John Mansel (1729 – 26 April 1794) was a British Army officer killed at the Battle of Beaumont.

John Mansel was born in Cosgrove, Northamptonshire in 1729, son of the Reverend Christopher Mansel, and Sarah Hoare. He married Mary Anne Biggin on 9 June 1768. Among their six children, one son John (1771–1839) became a major of the 3rd Dragoon Guards and ADC to his father, another Robert (1773–1838), joined the Royal Navy and rose to the rank of rear admiral.

In the army Mansel was made lieutenant-colonel commanding the 3rd Dragoon Guards on 27 April 1775 and became colonel of the regiment on 16 May 1781. Promoted to major-general on 28 April 1790, he commanded the 2nd (heavy) brigade of cavalry under the Duke of York and Albany in the Flanders Campaign from May 1793. He was at the relief of Menin on 15 September, and possibly at Sainghin on 27 October, although the heavy cavalry was apparently commanded by Prince Ernest on the day, as Mansel was not yet divisional commander. In 1794 he was with Erskine's column at Prémont on 17 April, but at the Battle of Villers-en-Cauchies on the 24th his command missed the action through a confusion in the orders that left Rudolf Ritter von Otto with just four squadrons to face 5,000 French.

At Beaumont on 26 April he led the cavalry flank attack in the valley of Cawdry and completely routed a column of infantry before plunging at the head of his troops across a ravine to attack a battery of 14 cannon on the other side.

"He passed the ravine, and, at the head of a considerable body of his men, charged the cannon with inconceivable intrepidity, and complete success. His heroic conduct decided the day; but at the mouth of this battery, after having three horses shot under him, he received his death wound. One grape-shot entered his chest, fracturing his spine, and coming out between his shoulders, while another broke his arm to splinters."

Mansel was buried in a redoubt with all military honours. Six generals—Abercrombie, Dundas, Harcourt, Garth, and Fox, who supported the pall—and the majority of senior officers of York's army attended the funeral.

Craig attributed the failure of the heavy cavalry at Villers en Cauchies "mainly to Mansel, whom after the action of the 17th [Premont] he had already reported as an incompetent officer." Mansel felt he was disgraced after Villers-en-Cauchies despite being reinstated, and swore not to survive. Whether he deliberately sought death or not though is disputed. Others "seemed to feel that a brave man had been untowardly sacrificed."

Military offices
Preceded by Flower Mocher	Lieutenant-Colonel; Lord Robert Manners'; 3rd (Prince of Wales's); Regiment of Dragoon Guards; 27 April 1775 – 16 May 1781	Succeeded by (self)
Preceded by (self)	Colonel; Lord Robert Manners'; 3rd (Prince of Wales's); Regiment of Dragoon Guards; 16 May 1781 – 26 April 1794	Succeeded by
Preceded by John Lambton	Colonel of the 68th (Durham) Regiment of Foot; 1794	Succeeded by Thomas Dundas
