= John Mansell (disambiguation) =

John Mansell was a baseball player.

John Mansell may also refer to:

- John Mansell (theologian), president of Queens' College, Cambridge
- John Maunsell or Mansell, English politician
- John Mansell, High Sheriff of Northamptonshire

== See also ==
- John Mansel (disambiguation)
