= John Mansel =

John Mansel may refer to:

- John Mansel (died 1265), King Henry III of England's leading councillor
- John Mansel (British general) (1729–1794), British Army cavalry general killed at the Battle of Beaumont
- John Mansel of the Mansel Baronets

== See also ==
- John Mansell (disambiguation)
