= Franz Joseph, Count Kinsky =

Habsburg Austrian general

Franz Joseph, Count Kinsky of Wchinitz and Tettau
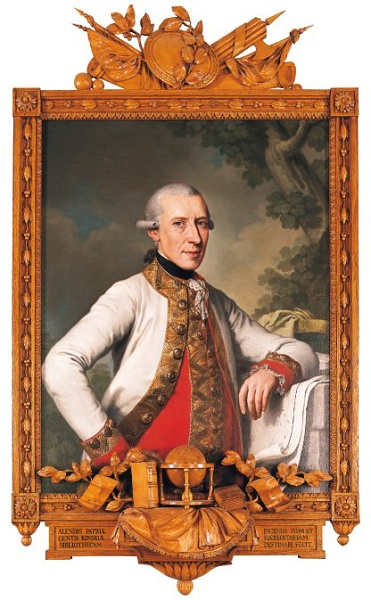
- Born: 6 December 1739; Prague, Kingdom of Bohemia, modern day Czech Republic
- Died: 9 June 1805 (aged 65) Vienna, Austrian Empire
- Allegiance: (Habsburg monarchy) Habsburg Austria; Austrian Empire
- Branch: Infantry
- Rank: Feldzeugmeister
- Conflicts: War of the Bavarian Succession; Battle of Habelschwerdt; War of the First Coalition; Siege of Landrecies; Battle of Tourcoing
- Other work: Inhaber Infantry Regiment Nr. 47; Chamberlain, 1760; Privy Councillor, 1801; Theresian Military Academy, Director 1779–1805

Franz Joseph, Count Kinsky of Wchinitz and Tettau (6 December 1739 – 9 June 1805) was a Habsburg Austrian general in the War of the Bavarian Succession and the French Revolutionary Wars. A nobleman from the House of Kinsky, he began his military service in 1759 and within ten years he commanded an infantry regiment. Ahead of his time, he began a school in his regiment to train officer cadets. As a general officer he led troops in a successful action against Prussia in 1778. A year later he was appointed Inhaber of an infantry regiment and Director of the Theresian Military Academy in Wiener Neustadt; he held both posts during the remainder of his life. In the Flanders Campaign in 1794, he commanded an infantry division against the French. He led an attack column at Tourcoing where he failed to support Prince Frederick, Duke of York and Albany. He was promoted to Feldzeugmeister in September 1794. He held no more active commands and died at Vienna in 1805.

== Early career ==
Franz Joseph Kinsky was born into the House of Kinsky in Prague on 6 December 1739. His father Count Franz Ferdinand Kinsky of Wchinitz and Tettau (1678–1741) held the title Highest Councillor of the Kingdom of Bohemia. His mother was his father's second wife, Countess Maria Augustina Pálffy ab Erdöd (1714–1759). He joined the Habsburg Austrian army in 1759 and was an Imperial Chamberlain the next year. He was promoted to major on 13 October 1764. He was elevated in rank to Oberst (Colonel) 24 February 1768 and appointed to command an infantry regiment. He started an officer cadet school in his regiment with his own funds, the first cadet school in the Austrian army. He was promoted to General-major on 1 May 1773. During the War of the Bavarian Succession in 1778 he commanded a column in the successful raid on Habelschwerdt.

The year 1779 was an important one for Kinsky. On 13 June 1779 he was appointed Inhaber (Proprietor) of Infantry Regiment Nr. 47, a dignity he held until his death. This was followed by his posting as Local Director of the Theresian Military Academy in Wiener Neustadt on 12 July. He married Countess Maria Renata von und zu Trauttmansdorff (1741–1808) a week later on 19 July 1779. He received promotion to Feldmarschall-Leutnant on 19 March 1785 and two days later was named Supreme Director of the Theresian Military Academy.

== French Revolution ==
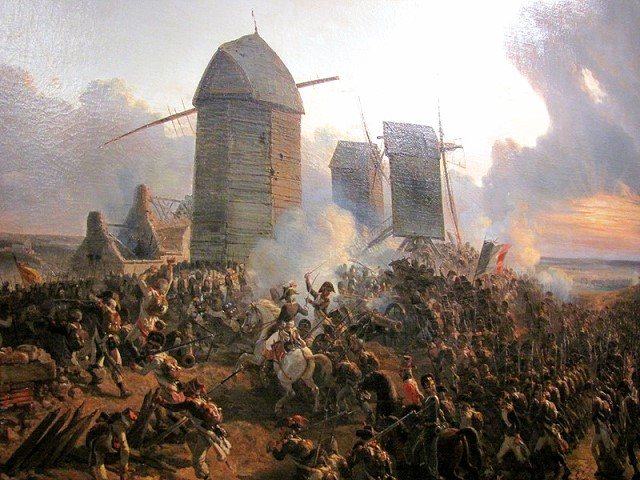
Kinsky led a column at the Battle of Tourcoing.

In 1794 Kinsky was sent to the Austrian Netherlands to fight the Republican French during the War of the First Coalition. He served in the Coalition army commanded by Prince Josias of Saxe-Coburg-Saalfeld in the Flanders Campaign, leading a division consisting of brigades under von Heister and Anton Ernst Mittrowsky. In mid-May, Karl Mack von Leiberich planned an operation whereby 73,350 Coalition troops would advance to catch the French divisions of Joseph Souham and Jean Victor Marie Moreau in a trap. The operation called for six columns to converge on the French units holding a salient at Menen (Menin) and Courtrai.

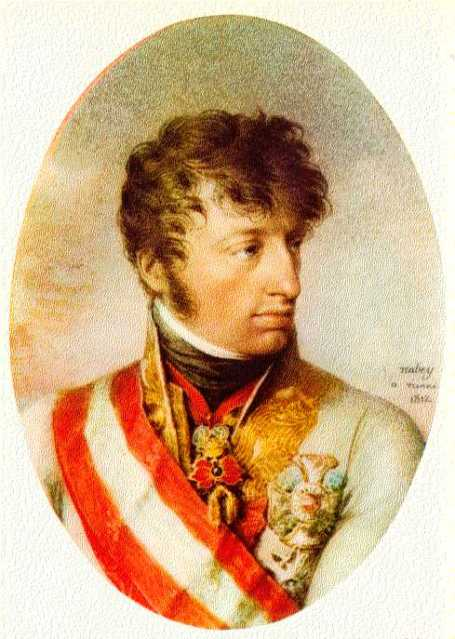
Both Kinsky and Archduke Charles (shown here) failed to support the Duke of York.

On 17 May the Coalition columns were ordered to begin moving in order to get into their proper positions. The Count of Clerfayt with 19,600 soldiers was directed to advance south from Tielt, cross the Leie (Lys) River at Wervik and reach Tourcoing. The other five columns were ordered to move toward the northwest from the area of Tournai. Farthest north were Von dem Bussche's 4,000 Hanoverians. From north to south the other columns were Rudolf Ritter von Otto with 10,000 men, Prince Frederick, Duke of York and Albany with 10,750 troops, Kinsky with 11,000 soldiers and Archduke Charles, Duke of Teschen with 18,000 men. Kinsky and Charles were expected to defeat Jacques Philippe Bonnaud's division. Mack's plan was too ambitious and only Otto and York reached their proper stations at nightfall on 17 May. Clerfayt only began crossing the Leie at 1:00 AM. Bussche ran into stiff opposition, was drubbed and chased out of the area. Otto held Tourcoing and York reached Mouvaux. Kinsky and Charles pushed back Bonnaud's troops but Kinsky did not get farther than Bouvines and Charles was south instead of east of Lille.

York realized his column was badly exposed because of Bussche's defeat and Kinsky's lack of progress. He appealed to Emperor Francis to allow his column to pull back to Lannoy. Permission was denied. Instead, Mack ordered Charles to hurry up and assumed Kinsky would do the same. In fact, Charles had an epileptic seizure and his staff refused to disturb him. In the night, Mack sent Charles orders to drop off 10 battalions and 20 squadrons to observe Lille and move with Kinsky to Lannoy so as to cover York's left flank. In the absence of their army commander Jean-Charles Pichegru, the French generals - Souham, Souham's chief of staff Jean Reynier, Moreau and Jacques MacDonald - met the crisis resolutely. Acting commander Souham instructed Moreau to hold off Clerfayt while his own and Bonnaud's divisions counterattacked the Coalition columns under Otto and York. Meanwhile, André Drut's division near Douai was asked to mount a diversion against Charles' column.

After initial success in the north, Clerfayt's column was blocked by Dominique Vandamme. On the morning of 18 May, Souham and Bonnaud opened the Battle of Tourcoing by falling on the columns of Otto and York with 40,000 men. Otto was driven back while York was compelled to cut his way out of the trap with heavy losses in men and guns. As York's command was being mauled, several couriers arrived urging Kinsky to seize Sainghin-en-Weppes. The general retorted, "Kinsky knows what he has to do", but his soldiers did not participate meaningfully in the battle. It was the same with the archduke's column. When news of the Coalition debacle reached him at 2:00 PM, Kinsky retreated east toward Tournai in company with Charles. Historian Ramsay Weston Phipps remarked that, "the 29,000 men of these columns might have been a hundred miles away". One authority placed French losses at 3,000 killed and wounded plus seven guns captured out of a total of 82,000 men. The Coalition, which only managed to bring 48,000 troops into action, lost 4,000 killed and wounded plus 1,500 men and six guns captured. However, the French claimed to have captured 32 guns and inflicted nearly 1,900 casualties on York's column alone.

== Later career ==
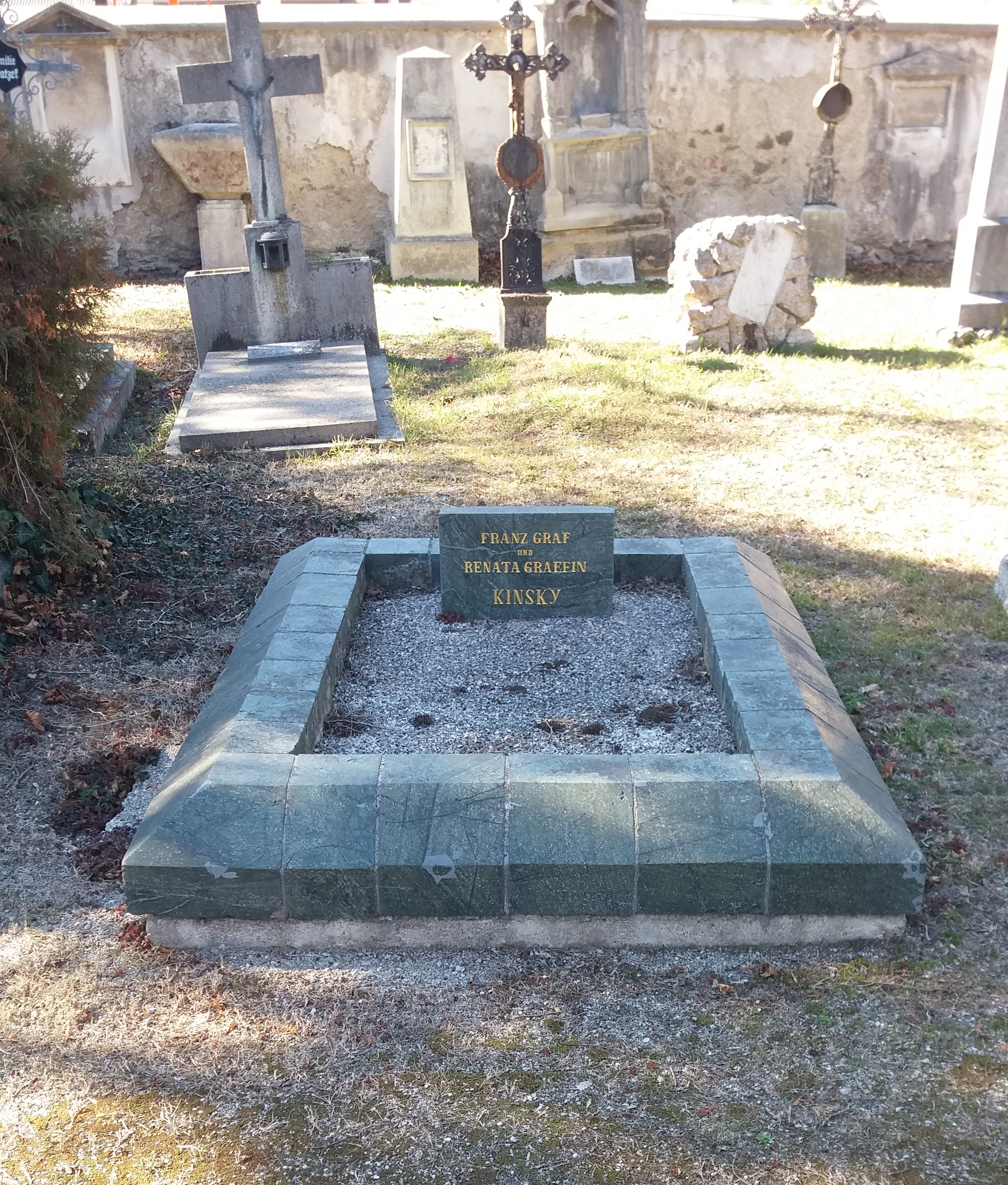
Kinsky's grave in Wiener Neustadt

Kinsky was elevated in rank to Feldzeugmeister on 22 September 1794. Since the promotion was to date from 19 April 1794, this implies that he distinguished himself in operations preceding the Siege of Landrecies which lasted from 21 to 30 April. However, there is no specific information. The records do not show that he held any other military commands after 1794. He was appointed an Imperial Privy Councillor on 3 December 1801. He continued as Supreme Director of the Theresian Military Academy until his death in Vienna on 9 June 1805. Five other Kinskys served as general officers during the period from 1792 to 1815. Kinsky's uncle Franz de Paula Ulrich, 3rd Prince Kinsky of Wchinitz and Tettau (1726–1792) became a Feldmarschall, his brother Joseph, Count Kinsky (1731–1804) also became a Feldmarschall, his nephew Philipp Joseph, Count Kinsky (1741–1827) became a General-major. Cousins Franz de Paula Joseph, Count Kinsky (1768–1843) and Karl, Count Kinsky (1766–1831), who were brothers, both became Feldmarschall-Leutnants.

== Notes ==
Military offices
Preceded by Ludwig Karl von Ellrichshausen	Inhaber of Infantry Regiment Nr. 47; 1779–1805	Succeeded by Ludwig von Vogelsang
