= René-Bernard Chapuy =

French soldier and general

René-Bernard Chapuy (known as Chapuis) was a French soldier and general who served in the Caribbean, American War of Independence and Wars of the French Revolution.

== Early career ==
Born in Nancy on 18 June 1746, he was enlisted as a soldier of the Régiment Recrus des Colonies on 4 October 1765, promoted sergeant in November 1766 and Fourrier in December 1770. He was embarked for the Windward Islands on 28 December 1772. On 4 February 1773 his unit was incorporated into the Régiment de la Guadeloupe, in which he became Sous-Lieutenant of grenadiers on 1 May 1775. Chapuis served in the American War of Independence from 1778 to 1782, becoming lieutenant on 4 February 1779. He obtained a pension of 400 Livres on 1 July 1783 and was appointed Aide-de-Camp to the Governor of Senegal Repentigny, in which role he served until 1 February 1786 when he returned to France.

== Wars of the French Revolution ==
Elected captain of a free company on 1 August 1792, Chapuis marched at its head to join the Armée du Nord and was elevated to lieutenant colonel commanding the 3rd Battalion of Chasseurs Francs du Nord on 15 September. Seeing service in the Flanders Campaign during 1792–1793, he was made provisional Adjudant General Chef de Brigade (Colonel) by Dampierre on 18 April 1793. On 12 September he was elevated to General de Brigade (major general) and three days later named commandant of the Fortress of Cambrai in place of Nicolas Declaye.

Under the command of Pichegru in the spring campaign of 1794 his command was greatly augmented with reinforcements to relieve the siege of Landrecies. Part of this force was driven back to Cambrai in confusion by 400 cavalry under Rudolf Ritter von Otto at Villers en Cauchies 24 April. Two days later on 26 April Chapuis led his entire command of 30,000 against the forces of the Duke of York, but suffered a catastrophic defeat at Beaumont (or Troisvilles) 26 April when he was surprised by a massive outflanking cavalry attack and his entire command routed. Chapuis was wounded with two sabre cuts and captured at the beginning of the action, his orders from Pichegru also falling into the hands of York.

Chapuis was exchanged on 23 September 1795 and re-entered France in time to take part in the defence of the Convention of 13 Vendémiaire Year III. He was reintegrated to his full rank on non-activity on 25 October. From January 1796 he was employed in the Armée des côtes de l'Océan at Noirmoutier, before retiring on 27 January 1801. He died at Étain (Meuse) on 15 April 1809.

== Assessment ==
"A startling example of both the old-style double-line formation and its weakness was supplied by… Chapuis’s defeat at Troisvilles, 26th April 1794… Arnaudin, an émigré serving with the Austrians, wrote of this debacle: ‘He put the centre column in line, in two lines, the left resting on the village of Aridencourt. Chapuis believed his flanks secure; however, a large body of Austrian and English cavalry took his division in flank and rear and scattered it".

At Troisvilles (Beaumont) he advanced without adequate reconnaissance and left his left flank wide open. He then tried to turn and face Otto's flank attack. "As well might he have tried to turn back the oncoming sea. The avalanche of mounted men descended on him and his doomed army. It was swept through and through from left to right and the whole force as one man took to flight".
