= Battle of Beaumont (1794) =

Battle of the War of the First Coalition

Battle of Beaumont-en-Cambrésis
- Part of the War of the First Coalition
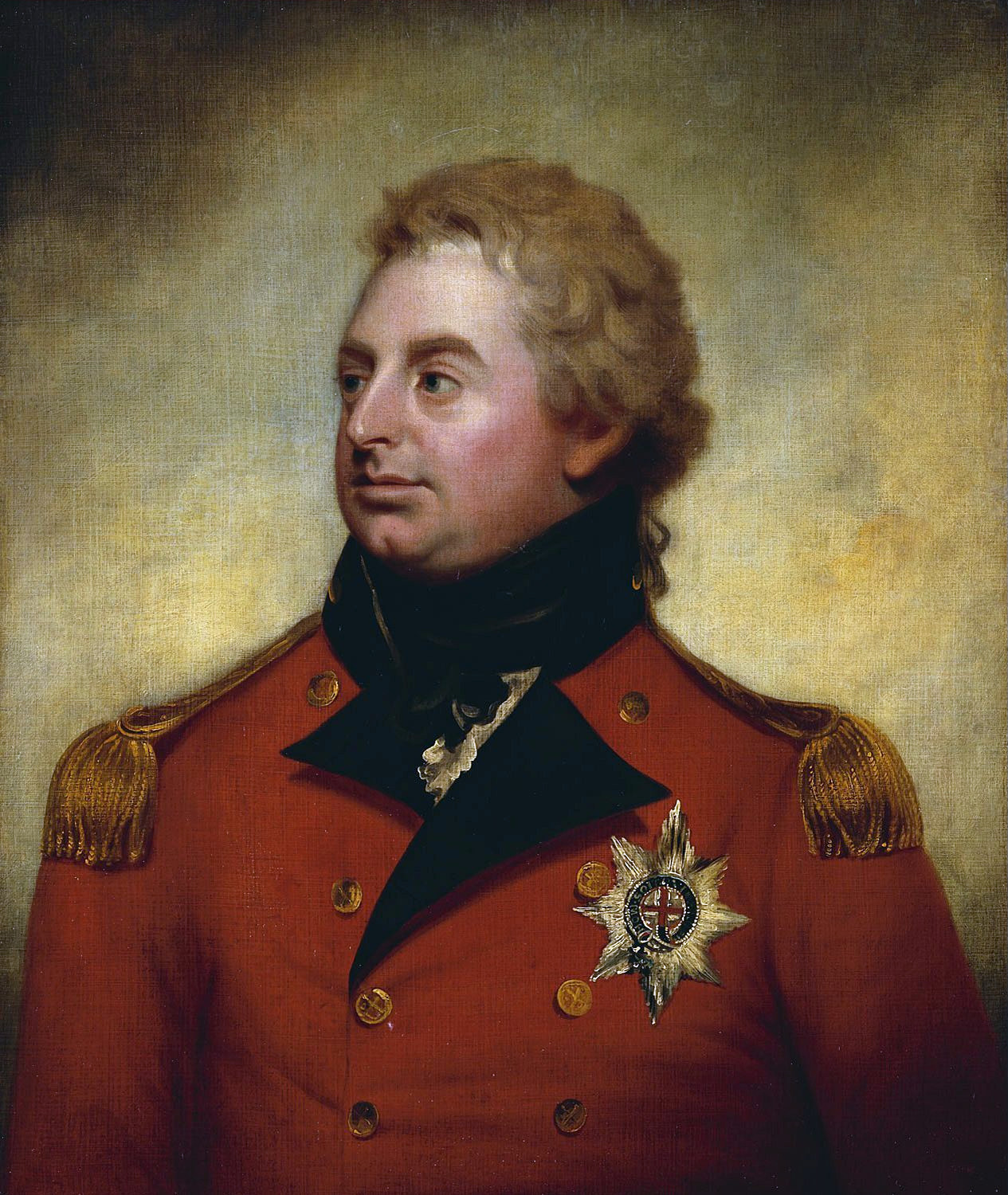
- Portrait of the Duke of York
Date	26 April 1794
Location	Beaumont-en-Cambrésis, Nord, France
Result	Anglo-Austrian victory

Belligerents
France	Austria; Great Britain

Commanders and leaders
(France) René-Bernard Chapuy (POW)	(Kingdom of Great Britain) Duke of York (Habsburg monarchy) Rudolf Ritter von Otto

Strength
30,000	20,000

Casualties and losses
7,000 killed, wounded or captured, 41 cannons	1,450 killed, wounded or missing

The Battle of Beaumont-en-Cambrésis 26 April 1794 (sometimes referred to as the Battle of Coteau, or in France the Battle of Troisvilles) was an action forming part of a multi-pronged attempt to relieve the besieged fortress of Landrecies, during the Flanders Campaign of the French Revolutionary War. The British and Austrians under the Duke of York defeated a French advance northwards from Cambrai commanded by René Chapuis (Chapuy). Rudolf von Otto, York's Austrian subordinate, led the main attack, which smashed the French flank and Chapuis was captured as a result.

== Background ==
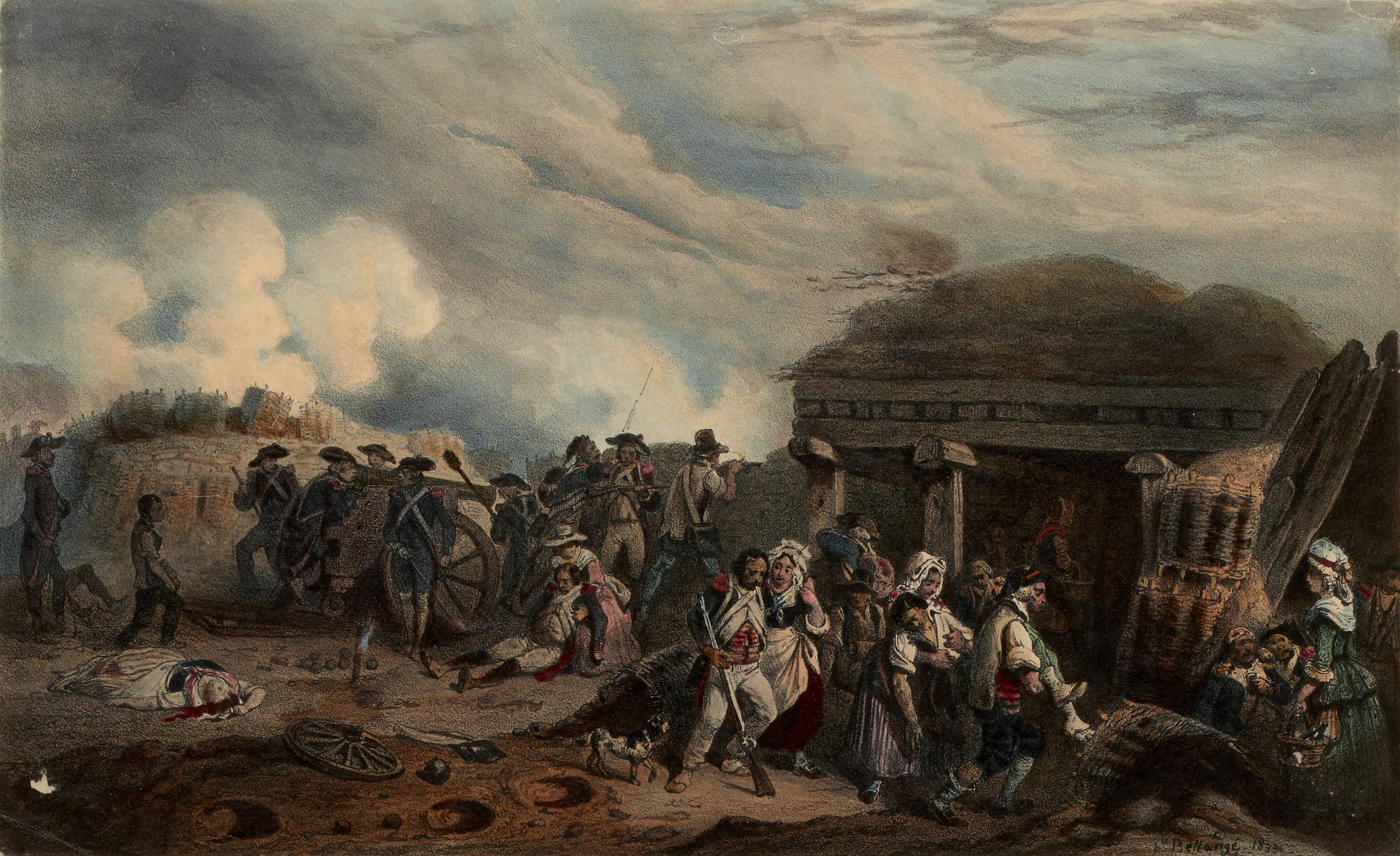
The Austro-Dutch siege of Landrecies, which Chapuy's army was attempting to relieve

In April 1794 the Dutch States Army under William, Hereditary Prince of Orange lay besieging the French-held fortress of Landrecies, covered by a field army that stretched in a semi-circle from Maroilles in the east through Catillon-sur-Sambre in the south to Le Cateau-Cambrésis on the west. The right wing at Le Cateau was under the command of the Prince Frederick, Duke of York.

The French Army of the North commanded by Jean-Charles Pichegru had been greatly bolstered during the winter by new recruits thanks to the Levee en Masse instigated the previous year by the Revolutionary government. With the situation for Landrecies critical, Pichegru launched a multi-pronged relief attempt against the besieging army.

Three French divisions were involved in the offensive. In the east Louis Charbonnier was ordered to advance with 30,000 men against the opposing forces of Franz Wenzel, Graf von Kaunitz-Rietberg. Jacques Ferrand was to advance from Guise with 45,000 troops to attack the east and south of the covering force. From Cambrai, René-Bernard Chapuy with 30,000 soldiers would attack the British under the Duke of York at the western end of the line.

The attacks were all launched simultaneously on 26 April but were uncoordinated. In the east 22,000 of Charbonnier's men under Jacques Fromentin attacked the Allied positions at Maroilles and Prisches and after a long struggle captured Prisches, severing communications between József Alvinczi to the north and Franz Joseph, Count Kinsky to the south. Alvinczi was wounded twice and command devolved upon the youthful Archduke Charles who led a counterattack which recovered ground and drove the French over the Little Helpe.

To the south, Count Heinrich von Bellegarde defending the line from Oisy to Nouvion was attacked by 23,000 French troops. But the victory at Prisches enabled the Archduke to send troops to his aid and this attack too was repulsed. In this action, Antoine Balland's division was routed.

== Battle ==
Troops attached to the command of General Chapuis had already clashed with the Duke of York two days earlier, when a column had been repulsed with great loss by just 4 squadrons of light cavalry under Rudolf Ritter von Otto at Villers-en-Cauchies, now however Chapuis was advancing with all his force.

Chapuis left Cambrai with nearly 30,000 men in two columns consisting of the Cambrai garrison and part of Goguet's Division and advanced towards Le Cateau through a thick morning fog. The larger column moved directly along the high road from Cambrai to Le Cateau, a smaller 4,000 strong second column moved parallel two miles to the south through the villages of Ligny-en-Cambrésis and Bertry. Before him the British lines were strung out across a ridge running south and facing Inchy, Troisvilles and Bertry. Suddenly the sound of musketry signaled the arrival of French columns looming out of the mist, and the allied advanced posts fell back in confusion through the village of Troisvilles. The French then deployed slowly and awkwardly while the alarm was raised, with the southern column moving to its left to join the battle near Troisvilles. For about two hours the French manoeuvered ineffectively in front of the British position while York's command planned a counter-move.

York came galloping up from Le Cateau and took station on the ridge (either in a redoubt or at a mill, accounts differ), and was presently joined by Otto. As the fog lifted one of them (probably York) noticed that the French left was exposed 'in the air' and vulnerable to an outflanking movement. Orders were given to assemble a huge force of 18 squadrons of Austrian and British cavalry unseen on the right flank in a hidden fold between Inchy and Béthencourt to attempt to roll up the French left wing.

York repeated tactics that had worked well for him at the action at Vaux the previous week. While the turning force was assembling under Otto, the artillery under Sir William Congreve were ordered to keep up a regular fire to the front in order to draw French attention in that direction. Light troops were sent to engage the French left. Just before the attack began York ordered his light troops in front of Troisvilles to fall back through the village, which further encouraged the French infantry to follow up triumphantly.

Otto's flanking cavalry meanwhile were drawn up in three lines, the first consisting of six squadrons of Zeschwitz Cuirasiers (Austrian) under Prince Schwarzenberg, the second line of John Mansel's Dragoon brigade (i.e. 2 squadrons each of the Blues, the Royals and the 3rd Dragoon Guards) (British), and the third line of the 1st and 5th Dragoon Guards plus the 16th Light Dragoons (British).

Two days earlier Mansel's brigade had failed to support Otto at Villers-en-Cauchies, apparently due to a communication error, however although Mansel was officially cleared of responsibility a cloud nevertheless hung over the brigade, which was eager to redeem its honour. Before the attack York rode up to the head of the brigade, reminding it how he was 'displeased' with its conduct two days previously, but had every confidence it would 'regain its credit'.

=== Anglo-Austrian charge ===
In this order Otto's command moved off cautiously, taking advantage of dips and hollows in the topography to conceal their movement, until they reached a hollow about half a mile west of Beaumont just north of the high road. Before them lay more than 20,000 infantry serenely facing eastward unaware of the storm about to burst on them from the north. At the last minute Chapuis spotted the force and hurried two battalions and a few guns to ward off the blow, but it was too little, too late. Otto's cavalry swept down from the north taking the French completely by surprise. The first enemy they came against was a body of cavalry with Chapuis himself at their head. He was promptly taken prisoner and the cavalry scattered.

With wild cheering the allied cavalry whirled down upon the left and rear of the French. Artillery and infantry hastily wheeled about to face the charge with canister and musketry, but made little impact on the avalanche of cavalry, which swept through the French ranks from left to right, sabres flashing. "We could observe from the camp several of our squadrons charging through the French cavalry, then through the French infantry, after which they would wheel round, and charge back again in the same manner, so that it was impossible for the enemy to rally or collect their terrified troops." Within a few minutes the French command was a confused mass of fleeing men.

=== Death of Mansel ===
The British cavalry had surpassed itself, and none more so than Mansel's brigade. Mansel, stung by the imputation of cowardice, had sworn he would not come back alive, dashing far ahead of his men he was cut down in the midst of the French ranks. However exact accounts of his death vary. It seems he survived the first charge and was recorded as later engaged against the French rear near Ligny. Sources describe him variously as killed by grapeshot (i.e. canister), struck down by three wounds, lying naked in a ditch with his throat cut or beheaded by a cannonball York's report says "Some time after the affair was over his body was found by some of the Skirmishers considerably in front of the main body of the Cavalry with a musket shot through the breast and the throat cut. His epaulets were cut off and his pockets rifled. His son likewise who was a very fine lad is missing and no tidings whatsoever have been heard of him." Mansel's son had in fact been taken prisoner by the retreating French.

=== French retreat ===
Aside from the destruction of the main French column, a detachment that had been pushed forward to Troisvilles was driven back by two guns commanded by Congreve and joined the rest of the rout. Meanwhile, the 4,000-strong southern column had advanced beyond Maurois with its artillery, but on encountering the fugitives began to retire in good order. This was spotted by Major Stepheicz with two squadrons of the Austrian Archduke Ferdinand Hussars and four of the British 7th and 11th Light Dragoons, who followed up and drove the rearguard back onto the main body to the west of Maretz. A few miles further on he came up with the main body and completely dispersed it, capturing 10 guns. In this part of the field alone 1,200 were reported killed. Chapuis' command was pursued by a wide detour all the way to the gates of Cambrai.

== Aftermath ==
Mansel's son, taken prisoner by the retreating French as he tried to save his father's life was later exchanged and declared that during the battle "there was not, on the 26th, a single French soldier left in the town" as Chapuis had drawn out the whole garrison of Cambrai to support the attack on Inchy. Had this been known at the time a detachment could easily have walked into Cambrai as the French retreated by a very circuitous route.

Otto's charge claimed to have killed 2,000 and captured 350 plus capturing 22 guns. It was estimated that the total losses of the French were 41 guns and 7,000 killed, wounded and missing. In addition when Chapuis was captured Pichegru's orders for the campaign were found in his pocket. In Otto's command the Austrians reported a loss of 9 officers, 228 men and 208 horses, the British six officers, 156 men and 289 horses killed, wounded and missing. The overall Allied loss was just under 1,500 men.

Fortescue describes this action as "the greatest day in the annals of the British horse". The French historian Coutanceau offers this tribute: "The decisive day of the campaign: it shows an army immobilized in front of a fortress, being out-manoeuvred and turned by an active and enterprising enemy, propelled by the invincible spirit of the offensive."

== Bibliography ==
- Fortescue, Sir John British Campaigns in Flanders 1690–1794 (extracts from Volume 4 of A History of the British Army) (London: Macmillan) (1918).
- Alfred H Burne The Noble Duke of York (Staples Press 1949)
- Coutanceau, Michel Henri Marie La Campagne de 1794 a l'Armée du Nord (1903–08 5 Volumes) (Paris: Chapelot)
- Brown, Robert An impartial Journal of a Detachment from the Brigade of Foot Guards, commencing 25th February, 1793, and ending 9th May, 1795 (London 1795)
- Anon. (an Officer of the Guards) An Accurate and Impartial Narrative of the War 2 Volumes (London 1796)
- Urban, Mark. Generals: Ten British Commanders Who Shaped the World. Faber and Faber, 2005.
- Rodger, NAM. Command of the Ocean: A Naval History of Britain 1649–1815, London, 2007
- Harvey, R: War of Wars: The Epic Struggle Between Britain and France 1789–1815. London, 2007
