= Siege of Landrecies (1543) =

1543 siege

- Part of the Italian War of 1542–1546
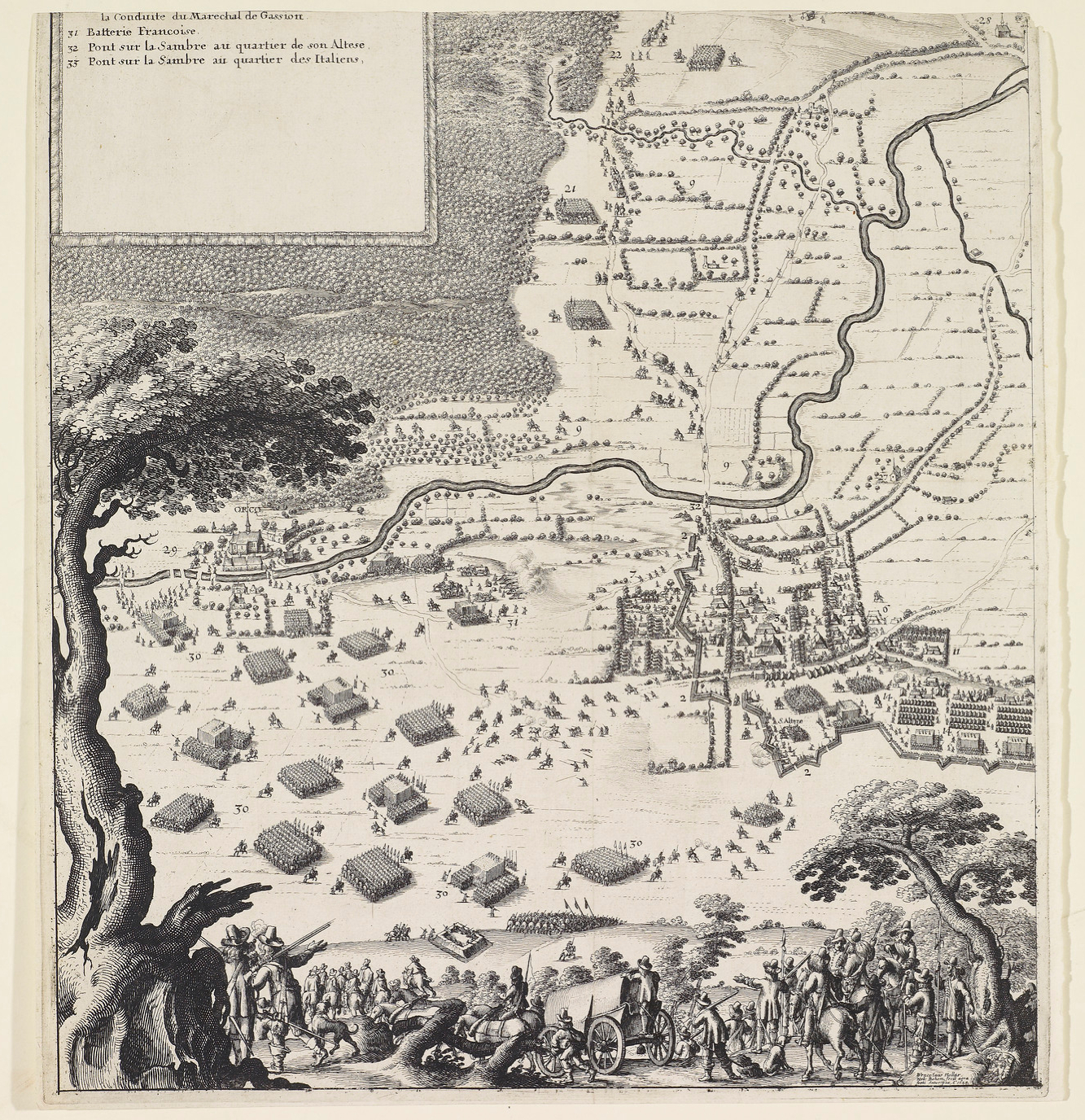
- 17th-century depiction of the Siege of Landrecies
Date	May 1543 - November 1543
Location	Landrecies, Kingdom of France 50.126°N 3.691°E
Result	French Victory

Belligerents
Kingdom of Spain; Kingdom of England	Kingdom of France

Commanders and leaders
Ferrante Gonzaga	Martin du Bellay

The siege of Landrecies (1543) took place during the Italian War of 1542–46. Landrecies was besieged by Imperial and English forces under the command of Ferrante Gonzaga. They were repulsed by the French defenders under the command of Martin du Bellay.
