= Rudolf Ritter von Otto =

Austrian military leader

- Born: 1735
- Died: 7 August 1811 (aged 75–76)
- Allegiance: Saxony: Holy Roman Empire; • Habsburg monarchy
- Branch: (Electorate of Saxony) Saxon Army: Army of the Holy Roman Empire; • (Habsburg monarchy) Imperial-Royal Army
- Rank: General of Cavalry (1803)
- Conflicts: First Coalition (Villers-en-Cauchies, Beaumont)

Rudolf Ritter von Otto (1735 – 7 August 1811) was an Austrian military leader. He began his military career in the army of the Electorate of Saxony, transferred to the Austrian army and had a distinguished combat record as a cavalry officer during the Seven Years' War and the French Revolutionary Wars. He achieved impressive victories at the battles of Villers-en-Cauchies and Beaumont despite significant numerical inferiority, although his troops were more experienced and the sources do not specify that his opponents used all available forces.

== Early career ==
Born in Weißenfels in the Electorate of Saxony in 1735, Otto joined the Saxon army in 1753 as a cavalryman. In the Seven Years' War he fought at the battles of Kolín and the Breslau in 1757. He was also present at several sieges and skirmishes. He joined an Austrian Freikorps raised by his brother Wilhelm and participated in several successful ambushes and raids in 1760–1762.

== Austrian service ==
At the end of the war he formally entered the Austrian army, joining the Hesse-Darmstadt Dragoon Regiment # 19 as an Oberleutnant. Promoted to captain in 1769 and major in 1777, he transferred to the Graeven Hussar Regiment # 34. Because he improved his new regiment's efficiency, he was rapidly promoted, first to Oberstleutnant in 1783 and Oberst in 1784. In the Austro-Turkish War (1788–1791), he led his regiment in action at Chernivtsi and Cornia. Promoted to General-major in 1788, he continued to distinguish himself against the Turks.

In 1793 during the War of the First Coalition, Otto joined the Austrian army in Flanders, serving at the siege of Valenciennes. At the battle of Caesar's Camp on 7 August, he commanded an infantry-cavalry brigade in the Count of Clerfayt's column. On 12 September he participated in the cavalry action at Avesnes-le-Sec in which a French force was cut to pieces. On 30 October he led his troops in battle at Marchiennes. He was promoted to Feldmarschal-Leutnant on 1 January 1794 and also became proprietor (inhaber) of the Hussar Regiment # 32.

On 24 April, while leading two Austrian and two British cavalry squadrons on a reconnaissance toward Cambrai, Otto encountered a force of French cavalry. At this time, he discovered that Emperor Francis II was nearby with his retinue. Fearing that his sovereign was about to be captured, he resolved to attack the enemy. In the ensuing Battle of Villers-en-Cauchies, Otto's troopers smashed a 7,000-man French division, inflicting 1,200 casualties.

Two days later, Otto led the main attack in the Duke of York's victory at Beaumont, rolling up the French flank and capturing the French commander René Chapuis. At the Battle of Tourcoing, he led one of York's three columns. Though the Anglo-Austrian army went down to defeat, Otto performed well.

== Later career ==
In 1796, Otto declined a command in Italy due to ill-health. He became a member of the Aulic Council and was promoted to full general upon retirement in 1803. He died at his estate near Königgrätz on 7 August 1811.
