= Battle of Mouscron =

1794 battle of the War of the First Coalition

Coordinates: 50°44′N 3°13′E

- Part of the Flanders campaign in the War of the First Coalition
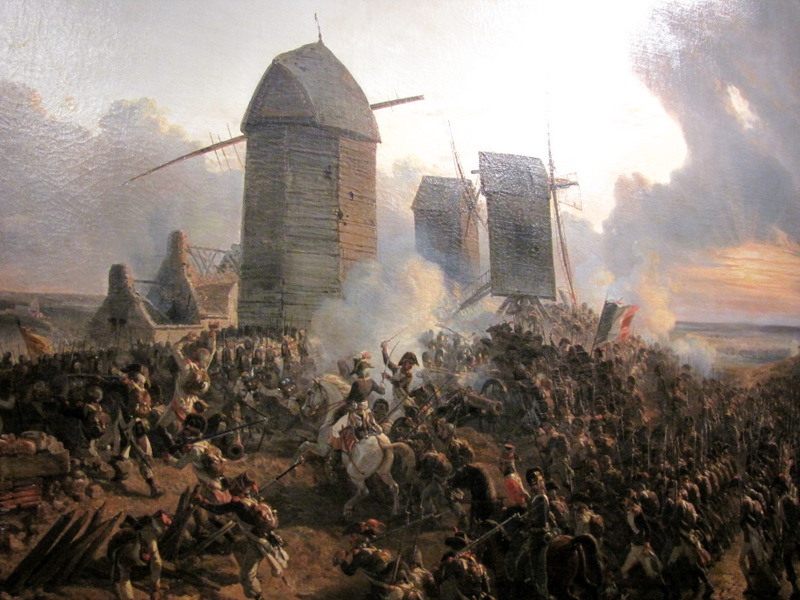
- The Battle of Mouscron; Charles Mozin
| Date | 28–29 April 1794 |
| Location | Mouscron, present-day Belgium |
| Result | French victory |

Belligerents
| Republican France | (Habsburg monarchy) Habsburg Austria (Electorate of Brunswick-Lüneburg) Hanover (Kingdom of France) French royalists Hesse-Kassel |

Commanders and leaders
| (France) Charles Pichegru (France) Joseph Souham | (Habsburg monarchy) Count of Clerfayt (Electorate of Brunswick-Lüneburg) Rudolf Hammerstein |

Strength
| Mouscron: 28,000; Menen: 14,000 | Mouscron: 10,000; Menen: 2,423, 28 guns |

Casualties and losses
| Mouscron: 1,500, 6 guns Menen: 500, 2 guns | Mouscron: 1,760, 24 guns Menen: 727, 10 guns |

The Battle of Mouscron (28–29 April 1794) was a series of clashes that occurred when the Republican French Army of the North under Jean-Charles Pichegru moved northeast to attack Menin (now Menen) and was opposed by Coalition forces under the overall leadership of François Sébastien Charles Joseph de Croix, Count of Clerfayt. In their initial advance, the French began the siege of Menin and captured Courtrai (now Kortrijk). With Habsburg Austrian reinforcements, Clerfayt counterattacked on the 28th but Joseph Souham soon massed superior French forces and drove the Coalition troops out of the area. This Flanders Campaign action happened during the War of the First Coalition, part of the French Revolutionary Wars. The battle occurred near Mouscron, Belgium, located at the French border 9 kilometres (6 mi) south of Kortrijk and at Menen, located 11 kilometres (7 mi) west of Kortrijk.

Because most of the Coalition army was covering the Siege of Landrecies, the early French advance was largely successful in driving back a weak screen of Hanoverian troops. On the north bank of the Lys River, a division under Jean Victor Marie Moreau besieged Menen, while Souham's division operated on the south bank. Clerfayt's foray enjoyed initial success at Mouscron, but Souham on his own initiative concentrated superior forces against the Coalition. Completely isolated by Clerfayt's defeat, the largely Hanoverian garrison of Menin under Rudolf von Hammerstein broke out of the fortress and escaped on the 30th. The next action occurred at the Battle of Courtrai on 10 May.

== Background ==
For the 1794 Flanders Campaign, the French deployed 160,000 troops in the Army of the North and 35,000 in the Army of the Ardennes. Against them the Coalition used approximately 150,000 soldiers from Habsburg Austria, the Dutch Republic and various contingents paid for by the Kingdom of Great Britain. Coalition strategy called for their armies to exert pressure the north and northeastern frontiers of France to open a path to Paris. Jean-Charles Pichegru had control over the two French armies whose lines stretched from Dunkirk on the North Sea west through Lille, Douai and Cambrai to Maubeuge. Army of the Ardennes was posted on the right wing and the newest recruits were used to man the fortresses. The French enjoyed numerical superiority but the Coalition fielded troops of better quality. According to the plan drawn up by Minister of War Lazare Carnot, the French were to turn both Coalition flanks. The Coalition army was headed by Austrian Prince Josias of Saxe-Coburg-Saalfeld who was supported by British Prince Frederick, Duke of York and Albany. Both armies operated on the cordon system which required troops to guard the entire frontier.

With 85,000 soldiers, Coburg began the Siege of Landrecies to start the 1794 campaign. Pichegru made two relief attempts but both were repulsed. On 26 April one of the columns commanded by René-Bernard Chapuy was crushed at the Battle of Beaumont-en-Cambresis by the Duke of York. In this fiasco, the French suffered losses of 7,000 killed, wounded and missing, plus 40 guns and 50 ammunition wagons taken. When Chapuy was made prisoner his captors found Pichegru's plan of campaign on his person. This outlined the attack that was about to be carried out in Flanders. These Republican French failures led to the surrender of Landrecies on 30 April 1794. French losses in the siege amounted to 2,000 dead from enemy action or sickness and 5,000 captured.

== Pichegru's Offensive ==
On 13 April 1794, Pichegru was at Lille to organize his attack. His army consisted Pierre Antoine Michaud's division at Dunkirk with 13,943 soldiers, Jean Victor Marie Moreau division at Cassel with 15,968 troops, Joseph Souham's oversized division at Lille with 31,865 men and Pierre-Jacques Osten at Pont-à-Marcq with a 7,822-strong oversized brigade. Pichegru assigned Moreau's brigade of Nicolas Joseph Desenfans to Souham. Moreau was assigned half of Michaud's division (approximately a brigade) as compensation. Austrian General François Sébastien Charles Joseph de Croix, Count of Clerfayt with 28,000 troops was responsible for covering the Coalition right wing.

On 23 April a French force advanced from Cambrai toward Denain, menacing Coalition troops led by Hessian General Ludwig von Wurmb. In response, Clerfayt was directed by Coburg's chief of staff, General Karl Mack, to move his forces south from his base at Tournai toward Denain. Clerfayt's forces were instrumental in preventing the loss of Denain, and hence the loss of communication between Coburg's forces at Landrecies and the Allied right wing at Tournai. However, well aware of the greater danger to Menin, Clerfayt was irritated by these orders from Austrian chief of staff Karl Mack von Leiberich, which left him too far away to quickly respond to any attack on Menin.

On 25 April Pichegru started to advance on Menin (now Menen) and Kortrijk (Courtrai). Michaud spread out between Veurne (Furnes) and Roesbrugge but his role was small in this offensive. Moreau moved down the north bank of the Lys River and began firing his cannon on Menen on the 28th. Souham advanced on the south bank of the Lys. Sending Jacques MacDonald with 15,000 troops to take and hold Mouscron to protect his right flank (facing the Austrians at Tournai) while he took Courtrai with the brigades of Desenfans and Herman Willem Daendels, Souham's division seized Courtrai on 26 April after a skirmish, during which the French forced the 1,500 Coalition troops protecting the city under Hanoverian General Georg Wilhelm von dem Bussche to abandon it. The Hanoverians in Bussche's detachment included two squadrons of the 9th Bussche Light Dragoon Regiment, one company of the 14th Diepenbroick Light Infantry Regiment, 200-foot soldiers from various units and a half-battery of artillery. The French Royalist units were one battalion of the York Rangers and two squadrons of Uhlans Britannique. The Hanoverians suffered 42 men killed, wounded or captured, and lost one field gun. French Republican and Royalist losses are unknown.

== Initial Actions Around Mouscron ==
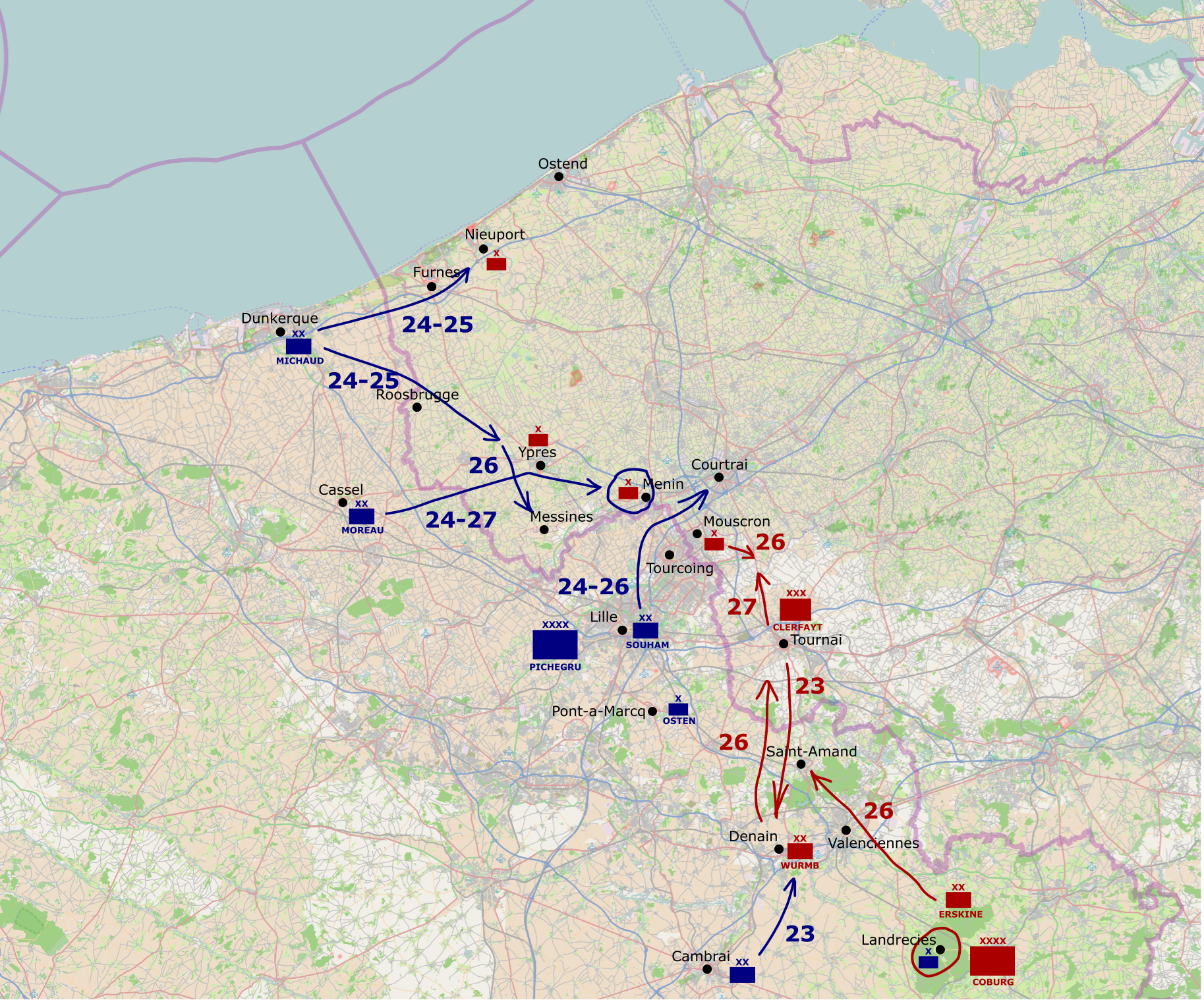
The opening moves of Pichegru's offensive on the Allied right flank. Concentrating his divisions on Ypres, Menin and Courtrai, Souham's division brushes aside a force of Hanoverians at Mouscron. After being distracted by attacks at Denain, Clerfayt marches toward Mouscron with what he has, to recapture the town. Numbers correspond to the dates in April that the marches denoted by arrows were undertaken.

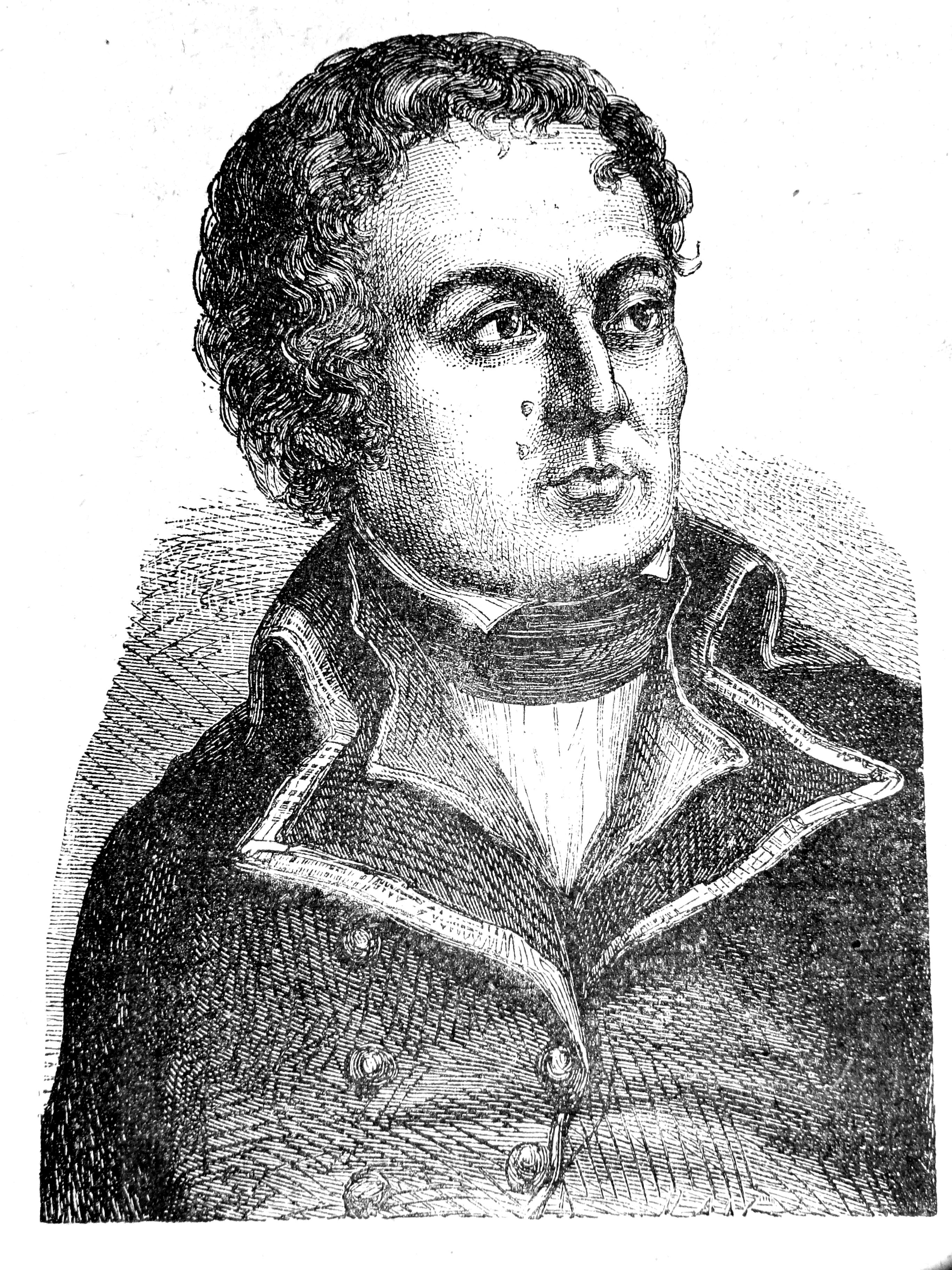
Joseph Souham

Also on the 26th, Macdonald's forces bumped into a force under Hanoverian General George von Oeynhausen at Mouscron. This Hanoverian detachment consisted four battalions of the 1st Scheither and 4th Bussche Infantry Regiments, two Jäger companies, two squadrons of the 7th Heavy Dragoon Regiment and five heavy guns. Oeynhausen moved east to Dottignies where his troops were able to hold their ground. Moreau and 14,000 soldiers invested Menen on 27 April. The 2,423-man Coalition garrison was commanded by Hanoverian General Rudolf von Hammerstein. The Hanoverian contingent was made up of one battalion of grenadiers, two battalions of the 14th Light Infantry Regiment, 62 horsemen from the 1st Leib Cavalry and 9th Light Dragoon Regiments and one foot artillery battery manned by 160 gunners. The remainder of the garrison consisted of 282 soldiers from the Hesse-Kassel Erbprinz Infantry Regiment, the French Royalist Loyal Emigrant Battalion and 17 Austrian gunners. Hammerstein's force had a total of 22 cannons and six howitzers. The brigades of Henri-Antoine Jardon and Bertin were left to hold Mouscron.

== First Day of Battle: 28 April ==
Once the Coalition came into possession of Pichegru's plans, Clerfayt was ordered to march his troops to the west, while Coburg sent 12 battalions of reinforcements under Sir William Erskine towards Tournai to strengthen Clerfayt against what was clearly the Allied main attack. By the 26th, Erskine was already in Saint-Amand.

Phipps remarked about Pichegru that, "nothing is more remarkable than the manner in which he managed to be absent when his army fought". While Clerfayt was on his way, general Oeynhausen had counterattacked Mouscron on 28 April itself and recovered it. According to historian Ramsay Weston Phipps, Nicolas Bertin's brigade was forced to retreat southwest to Tourcoing, while Henri Antoine Jardon's brigade withdrew north to Aalbeke. Another authority, Digby Smith asserted that Oeynhausen recovered Mouscron on the 28th after having suffered 111 casualties. That evening, Oeynhausen was reinforced to a strength of 3,600 by four battalions of the 6th Hammerstein and 9th Saxe-Gotha Infantry Regiments and two squadrons each of the Leibgarde and 4th Bussche Cavalry Regiments. All these were Hanoverian units. Also that evening, Clerfayt arrived with an Austrian force of seven battalions, ten squadrons and twelve 12-pounder cannons in addition to battalion pieces. There were two battalions each of the Sztáray Nr. 33 and Brentano Nr. 35 Infantry Regiments and two squadrons of the Blankenstein Hussar Regiment Nr. 16. The other units are not identified. Clerfayt commanded a total of about 10,000 troops, with another 2,000 defending Dottignies and Coeyghem to the rear. Clerfayt's Austrian generals were Johann Rudolf von Sporck and Adam Boros de Rákos.

In the event, Souham acted with initiative, ordering Jacques MacDonald to march his brigade east to Aalbeke (probably from around Halluin, where he probably helped with the siege of Menin from the south in conjunction with Moreau's division from the north) and take command of his, Jardon's and Bertin's brigades, a total of 16,000 troops. Souham then sent Daendels' brigade from Courtrai to join in the attack. In total, deducting losses and troops besieging Menin or garrisoning Courtrai, as many as 28,000 French troops out of Souham's 31,000 were engaged in battle on 29 April.

== Second Day of Battle: 29 April ==
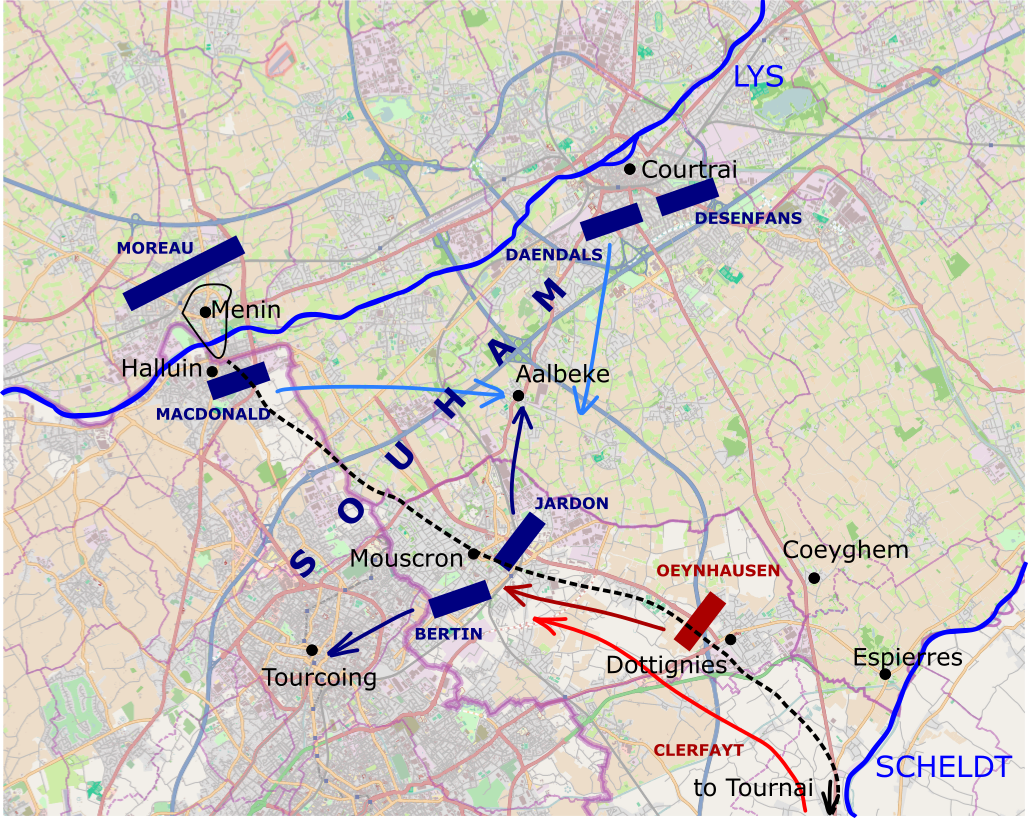
The battle of Mouscron, 28 April. Oeynhausen's forces recapture Mouscron from Bertin and Jardon, prompting Souham to concentrate his division to counterattack just as Clerfayt comes up with his main force in the night.

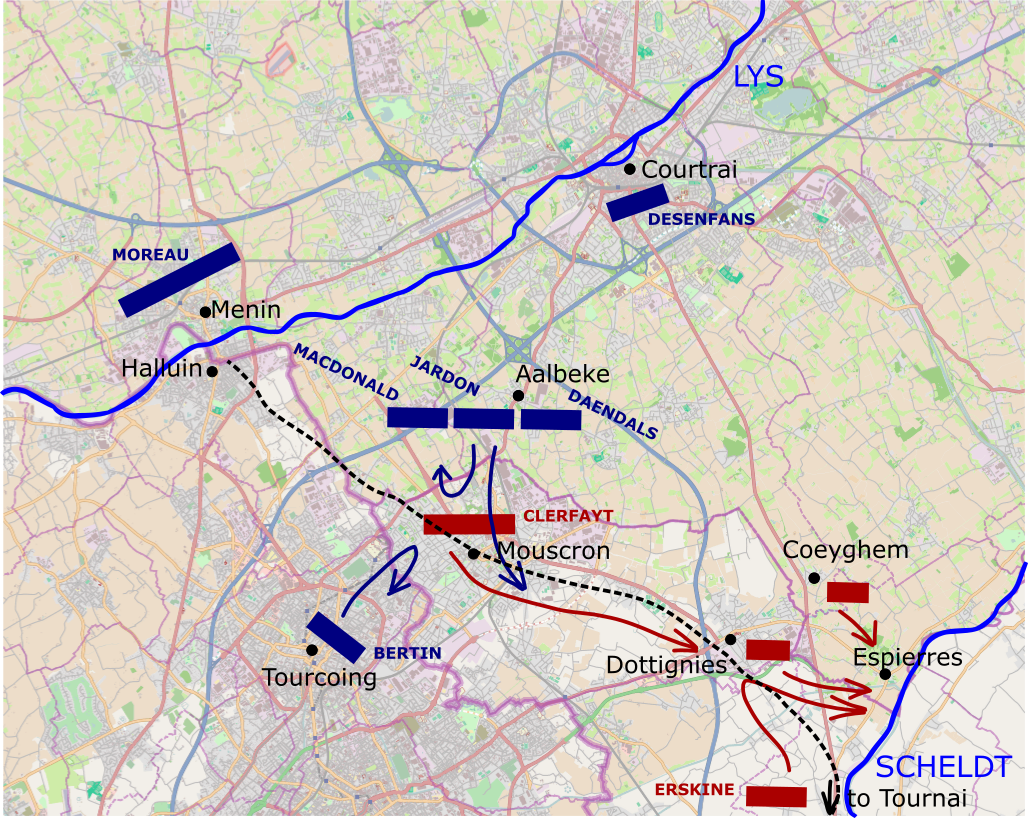
The battle of Mouscron, 29 April. Clerfayt's corps is attacked front and flank by Souham's corps-sized division. After repeated attacks, Clerfayt eventually gives way and retreats to Espierre, meeting reinforcements along the way.

On the 29th Pichegru was again unavailable. Souham launched a two-pronged attack on Clerfayt's 10,000 at Mouscron. While his three-brigade main force attacked frontally, Bertin's brigade turned Clerfayt's left and rear. Clerfayt had been preparing to gather reinforcements, attack and relieve Menin on the 30th, and was not expecting a counterattack. As such, his troops were not prepared for defence. Even so, and outnumbered 3 to 1, the Coalition troops defeated Bertin again and twice repulsed the attacks of Daendels and MacDonald. At 2:00 pm Souham demanded another effort as he and MacDonald personally led a final assault. French artillery superiority eventually proved decisive, despite a brief panic among the French troops. Clerfayt ordered a withdrawal, which rapidly turned into a rout that was only arrested by the arrival of the first six battalions of Erskine's twelve at Dottignies, in time to serve as their rearguard and stabilise the line. The corps then continued its withdrawal to Espierres on the Scheldt River.

== Results ==
The French Royalists in Menin were aware that they would be executed if captured. Therefore, on the night of 30 April the garrison of Menin broke out. Led by the Loyal Emigrant Battalion, Hammerstein's men cut their way out to the north. It was alleged that the escape was partly due to the carelessness of Moreau's brigade commander Dominique Vandamme. The garrison got away with most of their own artillery. The Hanoverians lost 38 killed, 123 wounded and 387 captured while the Royalists lost 92 killed and 87 wounded. Hessian and Austrian losses were not reported. The total loss was therefore 727 casualties and 10 artillery pieces. The garrison captured seven French guns but had to abandon five because they did not have enough horses to haul them. French losses were 500 men and two guns.

One source stated that the Austrians lost 3,000 prisoners, 33 artillery pieces and four colors in the Battle of Mouscron. Another authority gave Austrian losses as 903 casualties and 11 field guns and Hanoverian losses as 58 killed, 272 wounded and 527 missing plus five colors, 13 artillery pieces and 16 munition wagons captured. The total reported loss was 1,760 men and 24 guns. The Sztáray Regiment was severely mauled, losing 11 officers and 400 rank and file. The French suffered about 1,500 casualties and lost six guns.

After capturing Landrecies, the Coalition moved large forces into the area but they failed to concentrate them. They sent Clerfayt to the north side of Courtrai, the Duke of York to Marquain near Tournai and other forces to the east of Courtrai. The Hanoverian cavalry was victorious in a clash at Roeselare on 4 May. For a loss of three killed and 27 wounded, they inflicted 102 casualties on the French and took three artillery pieces. The next day there was an indecisive skirmish at Harelbeke in which Hesse-Darmstadt troops sustained losses of three killed and 18 wounded. The next significant action were the battles of Willems and Courtrai on 10–12 May 1794.

== Commentary ==
Phipps called Souham's actions in the absence of his army commander on 29 April "praiseworthy". He also noted that Clerfayt should have waited for reinforcements before offering battle. J. Rickard gave Oeynhausen credit for saving the Coalition position on the 26th and for recovering Mouscron. The French admitted that Hammerstein's handling of the breakout was most "creditable". Bertin was soon replaced in command of his brigade by Philippe Joseph Malbrancq.
