= Georg Wilhelm von dem Bussche =

Hanoverian Army officer

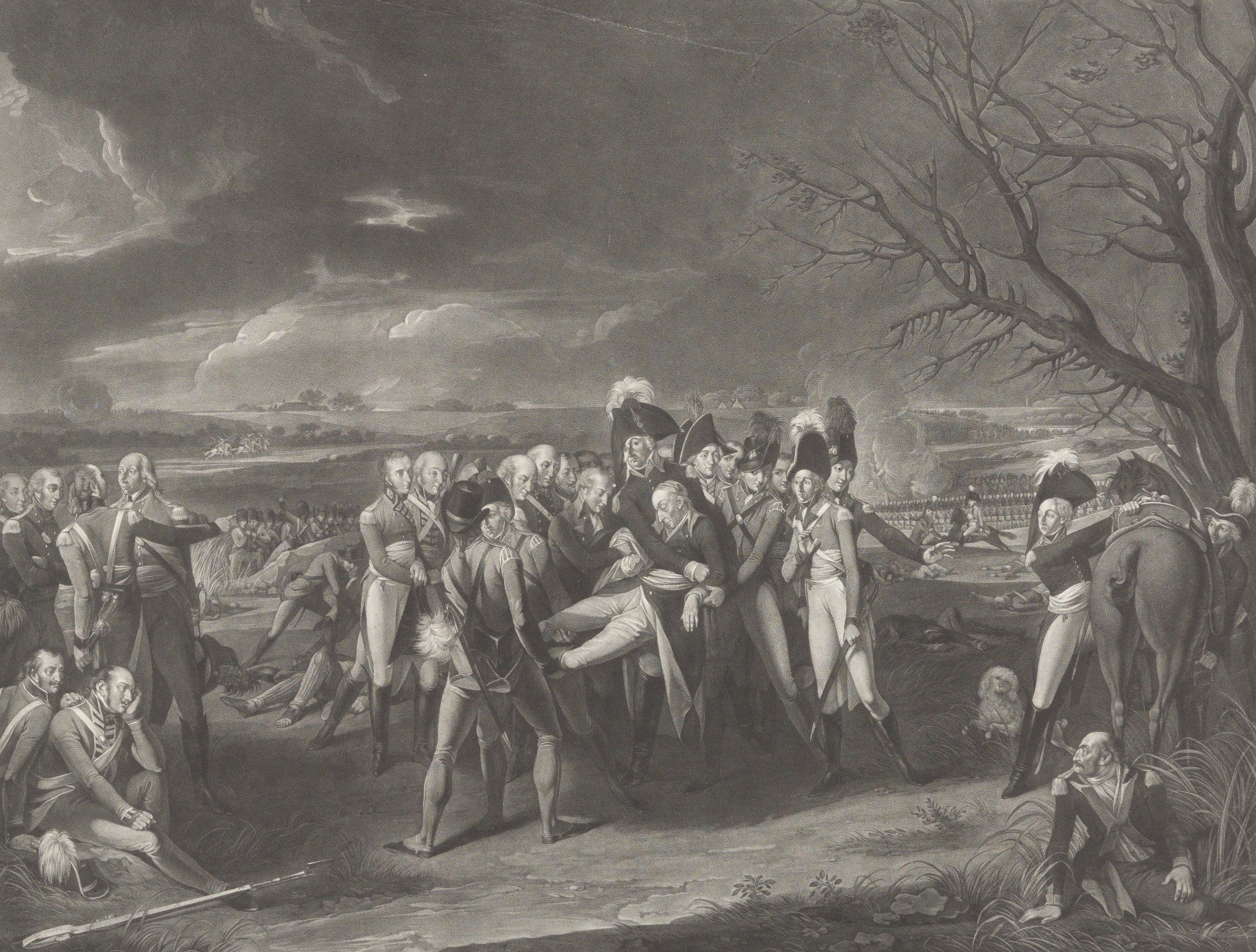
- The death of Bussche (centre) near Nijmegen
- Born: 19 July 1726; Minden, Prussia
- Died: 11 December 1794 (aged 68) Arnhem, Dutch Republic
- Allegiance: Electorate of Hanover
- Branch: Hanoverian Army
- Service years: 1743–1794
- Rank: General of the Infantry
- Conflicts: War of the Austrian Succession; Seven Years' War; Battle of Minden; Battle of Lutterberg; American Revolutionary War; Great Siege of Gibraltar; War of the First Coalition; Siege of Valenciennes; Battle of Hondschoote; Battle of Mouscron; Battle of Courtrai; Battle of Tourcoing; Battle of Tournay; Battle of Bommelerwaard

General of the Infantry Georg Wilhelm Baron von dem Bussche-Haddenhausen (19 July 1726 – 11 December 1794) was a Hanoverian Army officer. Born in Minden, he joined the Hanoverian army in 1743 and served in the War of the Austrian Succession and Seven Years' War, seeing action at the battles of Minden and Lutterberg. Bussche also commanded a Hanoverian battalion during the Great Siege of Gibraltar in the American Revolutionary War. During the War of the First Coalition, he fought at the battles of Valenciennes, Hondschoote, Mouscron, Tourcoing and Tournai. In 1794, while defending the Dutch town of Bommelerwaard from the French army, his hand was torn off by a cannonball and he died shortly afterward.

== Early career ==
Bussche was born in Minden, then part of the Kingdom of Prussia, on 19 July 1726. His father, Albrecht Hilmar von dem Bussche, who was a member of the judicial council, descended from a long line of Westphalian nobility. The Bussche family was a noble family of the Prince-Bishopric of Osnabrück which was closely connected with the Electorate of Hanover.

The early death of his father caused Bussche to move to Hanover and become a Page of Honour to Elector George II, Elector of Hanover, who also ruled the Kingdom of Great Britain. In 1743 he joined the Hanoverian Army and served in the War of the Austrian Succession, gradually advancing in rank.

== Rise to general ==
In the Seven Years' War he distinguished himself at the Battle of Minden in 1759; the same year he was promoted to major. He also performed with distinction at the Battle of Lutterberg in 1762, the same year he became Oberstleutnant (lieutenant colonel). He received command of a Hanoverian battalion in garrison at Gibraltar in 1775. He relinquished this position because of his subsequent promotion to Oberst (colonel) in 1776 and to Generalmajor in 1778. Nevertheless, one source placed him in command of the 1st Battalion of the 6th Hardenberg Hanoverian Regiment as lieutenant colonel during the November 1781 sortie in the Great Siege of Gibraltar. He became Inspector of Infantry in 1783 and lieutenant general in 1788.

== Flanders Campaign ==
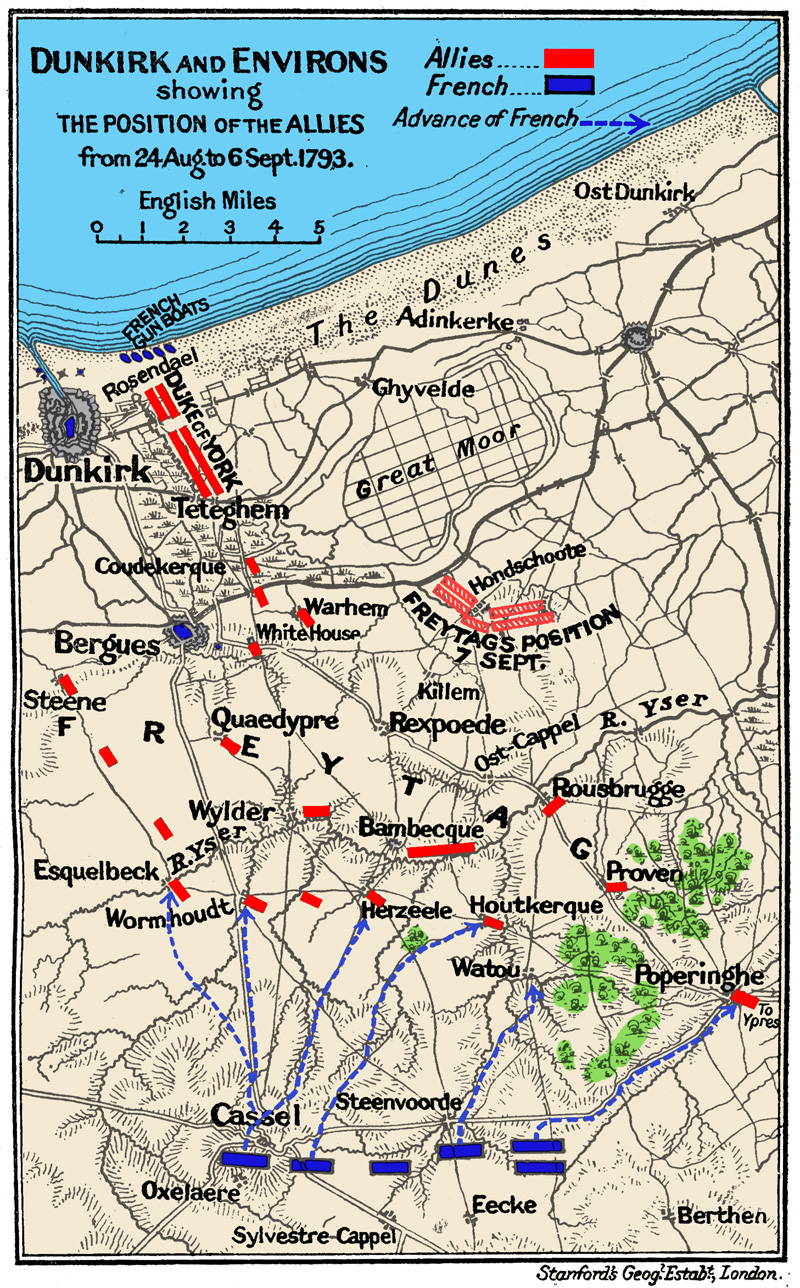
Positions on 6–7 September during the Siege of Dunkirk and Battle of Hondschoote

After the outbreak of the War of the First Coalition, Bussche was ordered to Kassel to organize the Hanoverian forces being collected there. When France declared war on Great Britain and the Dutch Republic on 1 February 1793, the Hanoverians were put under the overall command of Prince Frederick, Duke of York and Albany and Bussche given command of the 1st Division. At the Siege of Valenciennes from 25 May to 27 July 1793 Bussche led the 3rd Hanoverian Cavalry Brigade which included two squadrons each of the 1st Leib and 4th Bussche Cuirassier Regiments. The Duke of York began the Siege of Dunkirk on 24 August 1793 with 29,700 infantry and 5,400 cavalry. In the Hanoverian order of battle, Bussche was still leader of the 3rd Cavalry Brigade, consisting of the 9th and 10th Light Dragoons in addition to the 1st and 4th Regiments.

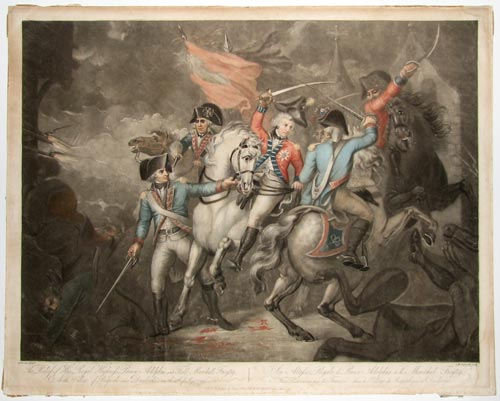
Capture of Freytag at Hondschoote

The commander of the French Army of the North, Jean Nicolas Houchard determined to raise the siege by attacking the 16,000-man covering army led by Hanoverian Field Marshal Wilhelm von Freytag. Not counting the 8,000-strong garrison of Dunkirk, Houchard had 45,800 troops available for the operation. The Battle of Hondschoote was fought on 6–8 September 1793. On the 6th the French advanced in six columns. The 9,000 men of the far right column sat still for two days and only moved against Ypres on the 8th, accomplishing nothing. The left two columns were repulsed, while the two right columns made progress. In the center, Jean-Baptiste Jourdan's 13,000 troops captured Houtkerque, Herzeele and Bambecque, and then, at the urging of the political commissioner Nicolas Hentz, they seized Rexpoëde. By this time it was evening and it began to rain.

Hearing that the French were nearer to Hondschoote than most of his covering force, at 8:00 pm Freytag gathered his soldiers into two columns and began to retreat toward Rexpoëde, believing the village was still in Coalition hands. When the right column reached Rexpoëde, it was charged by French cavalrymen who wounded and captured Freytag. The right column recoiled from the village and stumbled cross-country, but Johann Ludwig, Reichsgraf von Wallmoden-Gimborn leading the left column attacked Rexpoëde. The Hanoverians rescued Freytag and routed the French from the village, reaching Hondschoote early the next morning. Houchard and Jourdan spent all of 7 September rallying the center column at Herzeele. Bussche was also credited with the recapture of Rexpoëde and the freeing of Freytag. On 8 September Houchard with 22,000 soldiers defeated Wallmoden with 14,600 at Hondschoote after a stiff fight. The Duke of York abandoned the siege that day and withdrew.

During the Battle of Mouscron on 26–30 April 1794, Bussche defended Kortrijk (Courtrai) with 1,500 men including one battalion and two squadrons of French Royalists. His Hanoverians were two squadrons of the 9th Light Dragoons, one company of the 14th Infantry Regiment, 200 foot soldiers and one-half battery of artillery. After losing 42 Hanoverian casualties and one cannon, Bussche withdrew from the town. The 15,000 French were led by Jacques MacDonald. Bussche also participated in the Battle of Courtrai or Coighem on 10 May.

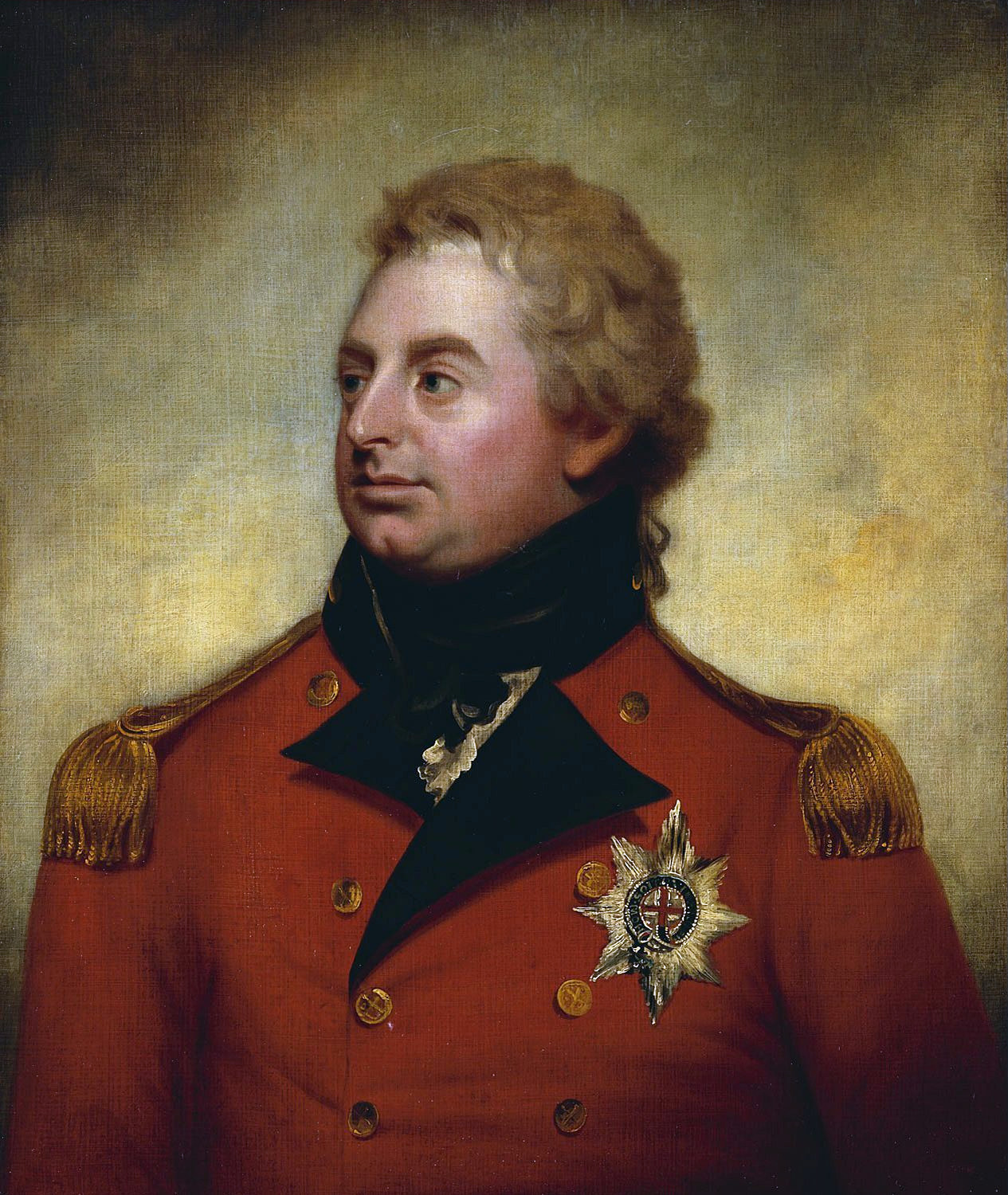
Duke of York

The previous actions left the French divisions of Joseph Souham and Jean Victor Marie Moreau in an exposed position at Courtrai and Menin. In the Battle of Tourcoing Austrian staff officer Karl Mack von Leiberich planned to envelop the two French division with 73,350 Coalition soldiers formed into six columns. The columns were numbered north to south. The first column of 4,000 was commanded by Bussche. It was supposed to start north from Warcoing to Dottignies and then turn west to Mouscron. Rudolf Ritter von Otto led second column of 10,000 soldiers, York directed the third column of 10,750 troops, Franz Joseph, Count Kinsky led the fourth column of 11,000 men and Archduke Charles, Duke of Teschen commanded the fifth column of 18,000 troops. The last two columns opposed Jacques Philippe Bonnaud's division near Lille. Finally, 19,600 soldiers under François Sébastien Charles Joseph de Croix, Count of Clerfayt would move down from the north, cross the Lys River and meet the other columns near Tourcoing, encircling the French. The Coalition columns advanced on 17 May 1794.

Bussche reached Mouscron but was attacked by a French brigade under Louis Fursy Henri Compère and driven back to Dottignies. Otto and York both reached their assigned positions on the 17th, but Kinsky and Charles fell far behind schedule. Clerfayt crossed the Lys at 1:00 am on 18 May, but found himself fighting French troops under Dominique Vandamme. The French Army of the North commander Jean-Charles Pichegru was not on the scene but the French generals accepted Souham as the acting leader. While Moreau held off Clerfayt's column, the large divisions of Souham and Bonnaud, altogether 40,000 men, would throw themselves on Otto and York. Because Kinsky and Charles were slow and Clerfayt was stopped, the French successfully executed Souham's plan, defeating Otto and York. Bussche's mostly Hanoverian command was made up of two battalions of the 1st Infantry Regiment, the 1st and 4th Grenadier Battalions, one French Royalist battalion, and two squadrons each of the 1st and 7th Cavalry and 9th and 10th Light Dragoon Regiments. The 1st Infantry lost many men captured.

The Battle of Tournay or Pont-à-Chin on 22 May 1794 was a Coalition victory. Pichegru attacked the allies with 62,000 beginning at 5:00 am. First contact occurred between the French brigade of Herman Willem Daendels and troops under Bussche at Spiere. After some fighting, Bussche withdrew across the Scheldt at Warcoing. Bitter fighting continued for 15 hours as the French tried to overrun the Coalition positions, but they finally had to retreat. In the following weeks, York was left to defend Tournai while the decisive actions occurred at Ypres and Charleroi. The French began the Siege of Ypres on 1 June and accepted its surrender on 18 June. The Coalition position in Belgium began to collapse and Brussels fell to Pichegru on 10 July. The British and Dutch fell back toward Holland while the Austrians retreated toward Germany.

== Death ==
The French recaptured Le Quesnoy, Valenciennes and Condé-sur-l'Escaut in August. By mid-September the Coalition-held fortresses in rear were reduced and the French resumed their advance to the north. On 2 December 1794, the Duke of York returned to Great Britain, leaving Lieutenant General Count Wallmoden to take command of the 45,000-man Coalition army in the Dutch Republic. At that time there were 32 British battalions and 30 squadrons, 14 Hanoverian battalions and 16 squadrons, 14 Hessian battalions and 14 squadrons and eight French Royalist battalions and 20 squadrons. On 10 December, under the direction of Daendels, the French launched an amphibious operation across the Meuse (Dutch: Maas) against the Bommelerwaard. The attack on Fort Sint-Andries failed completely because the garrison was warned by a French deserter. To the east, a diversionary attack led by Vandamme crossed the Waal under the cover of a fog and seized a Hanoverian battery near Gendt. Bussche appeared with the 1st and 3rd Hanoverian Grenadier Battalions and counterattacked. After a struggle in which Bussche was killed, the French spiked some of the guns and withdrew to their boats. According to one account, a cannonball tore off Bussche's hand and he died soon afterward. He was buried in the cathedral of Arnhem on 14 December 1794.
