= Battle of Courtrai (1794) =

Battle in the War of the First Coalition

Coordinates: 50°50′N 3°16′E

- Part of the War of the First Coalition
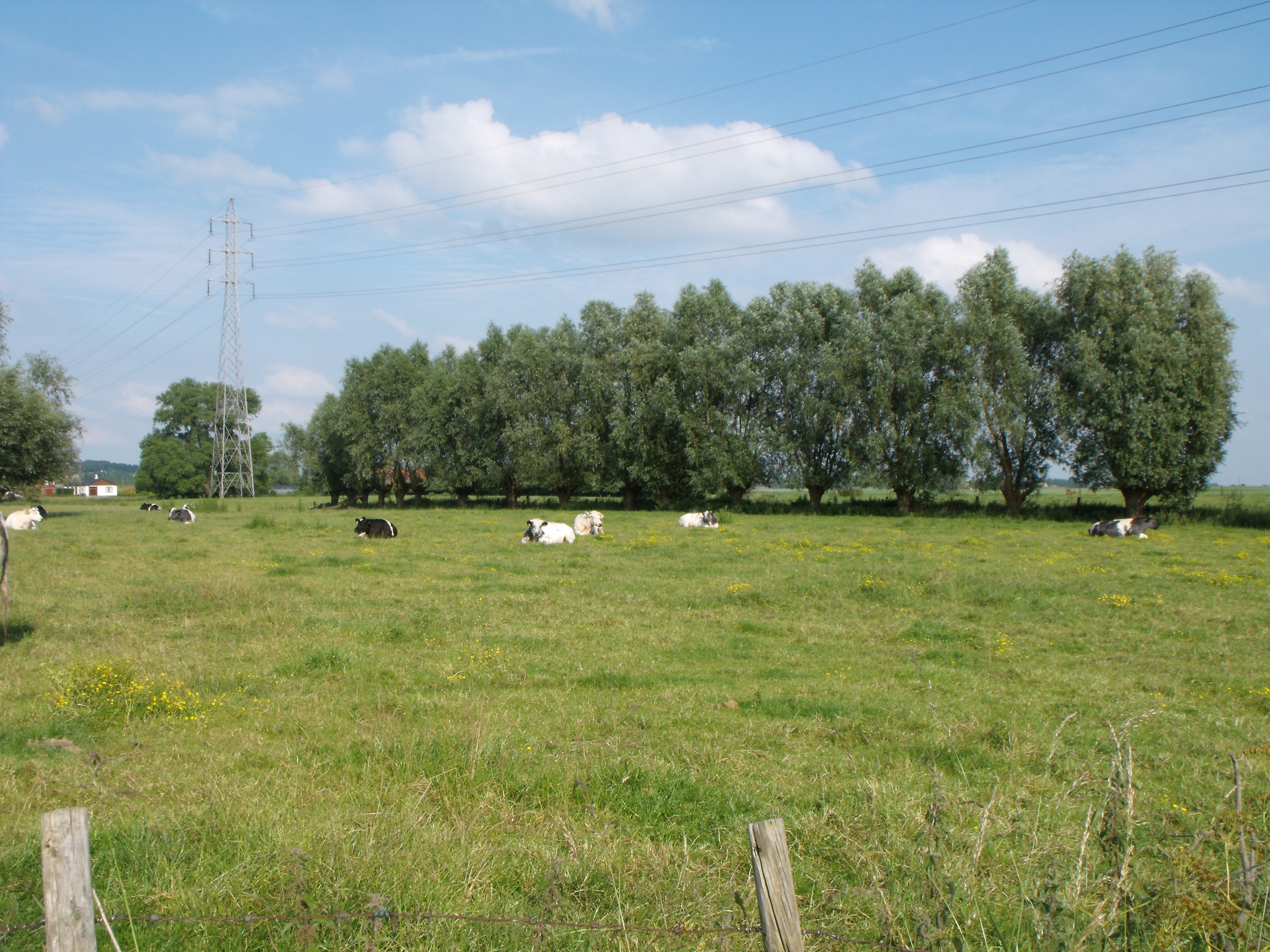
- The landscape on the outskirts of Courtrai (now Kortrijk) in 2009
Date	11 May 1794
Location	Kortrijk, Belgium
Result	French victory

Belligerents
Republican France	(Habsburg monarchy) Habsburg Austria (Kingdom of Great Britain) Great Britain (Electorate of Brunswick-Lüneburg) Hanover; Hesse-Darmstadt

Commanders and leaders
(France) Jean-Charles Pichegru	(Habsburg monarchy) Count of Clerfayt (Kingdom of Great Britain) Duke of York

Strength
60,000	40,000

Casualties and losses
1,000	1,500

The Battle of Courtrai (11 May 1794) saw a Republican French army under Jean-Charles Pichegru oppose Coalition forces commanded by François Sébastien Charles Joseph de Croix, Count of Clerfayt. The battle was fought as part of French efforts to defeat an Allied attempt to recapture Courtrai, which the French captured in the opening days of their 1794 offensive in the Low Countries. On 10 May, a French attempt to advance east toward Tournai was turned back by the Duke of York's troops in the Battle of Willems, but resulted in York himself retreating to Tournai once he realised he had underestimated the size of the French army. On the same day as Willems, Clerfayt attacked Courtrai (now Kortrijk) from the north but made little progress. On 11 May, with York's retreat, French forces turned on Clerfayt at Courtrai after York's retreat and forced him to retreat to the north. As a result of the battle, the French Army of the North maintained their grip on Courtrai and Menin (now Menen) which it had won in late April. The fighting occurred during the War of the First Coalition near Kortrijk, Belgium, located about 85 kilometres (53 mi) west of Brussels.

The battle of Courtrai refers specifically to the battle on 11 May, but the term is often also used to refer generally to both this battle and the battle of Willems together, as they were part of the same offensive.

== Background ==
=== Plans ===
For the spring 1794 campaign, Lazare Carnot of the Committee of Public Safety devised a strategy in which the French Republican Army of the North would attack the flanks of the Coalition forces in the Austrian Netherlands, under Jean-Charles Pichegru. On the western flank, under Pichegru's personal command, 100,000 troops were ordered to strike first at Ypres, then Ghent, and finally Brussels. On the eastern flank, 100,000 soldiers would thrust toward Liège and Namur in order to cut off Austrian communications with Luxembourg City. Meanwhile, 50,000 men held the center of the French line near Bouchain and Maubeuge. The defect of this double envelopment strategy was that the Allies might throw the main weight of their forces on either French wing and crush it.

In March 1794, the Army of the North numbered 194,930 men, of which 126,035 were available for the field. Counting the 32,773 soldiers of the subordinate Army of the Ardennes, Pichegru controlled 227,703 troops. In mid-April 1794, the Army of the North units in western Flanders were, from left to right: Pierre Antoine Michaud's division (13,943) at Dunkirk, Jean Victor Marie Moreau's division (15,968) at Cassel, Joseph Souham's (31,856) division at Lille, and Pierre-Jacques Osten's brigade (7,822) at Pont-à-Marcq.

At the beginning of April 1794, the Coalition forces under the overall command of Prince Josias of Saxe-Coburg-Saalfeld were deployed as follows. With headquarters at Tournai, Clerfayt commanded a field army of 24,000 Austrians, Hanoverians, and Hessians on the Allied right wing. Clerfayt was charged with defending Menin, Ypres, Nieuport, Orchies, and Marchiennes. Ludwig von Wurmb and 5,000 troops held Denain between the right wing and center. The Duke of York and 22,000 troops formed the right-center with headquarters at Saint-Amand-les-Eaux. Coburg and 43,000 men held the Allied center with headquarters at Valenciennes. William V, Prince of Orange and 19,000 Dutch soldiers made up the left-center, with headquarters at Bavay. The left wing under Franz Wenzel, Graf von Kaunitz-Rietberg counted 27,000 Austrian and Dutch troops and covered the ground between Bettignies (near Maubeuge) and Dinant. Under the eyes of Francis II, Holy Roman Emperor, Coburg's main Coalition army advanced on 17 April and invested the fortress of Landrecies. The Siege of Landrecies began on 21 April and ended on 30 April with a French surrender.

=== Mouscron ===
On 26 April, Allied cavalry smashed a 20,000-man French column that intended to relieve Landrecies, inflicting 7,000 casualties and capturing its commander René-Bernard Chapuy along with Pichegru's plans for overrunning coastal Flanders. Meanwhile, the French harassed Wurmb's troops at Denain, compelling Clerfayt to send 8,000 from his right wing to their aid. On 24 April, Michaud's 12,000-man division advanced toward Nieuport and Ypres, Moreau's 21,000-strong division surrounded Menin, and Souham's 30,000-man division moved toward Courtrai, which it captured. With Pichegru's plans in his hands, Coburg sent a reinforcement of 12 infantry battalions and 10 cavalry squadrons under Sir William Erskine to the right wing and ordered Clerfayt's 8,000 men from Denain back to Tournai. It was too late; Souham defeated the badly-outnumbered Clerfayt in the Battle of Mouscron on 29 April, inflicting 2,000 casualties and capturing 23 guns. The following night, the Coalition garrison abandoned Menin. In the Allied rear areas there was a panicky retreat of supply trains headed for Ghent and Brussels.

=== The Allied Counteroffensive ===
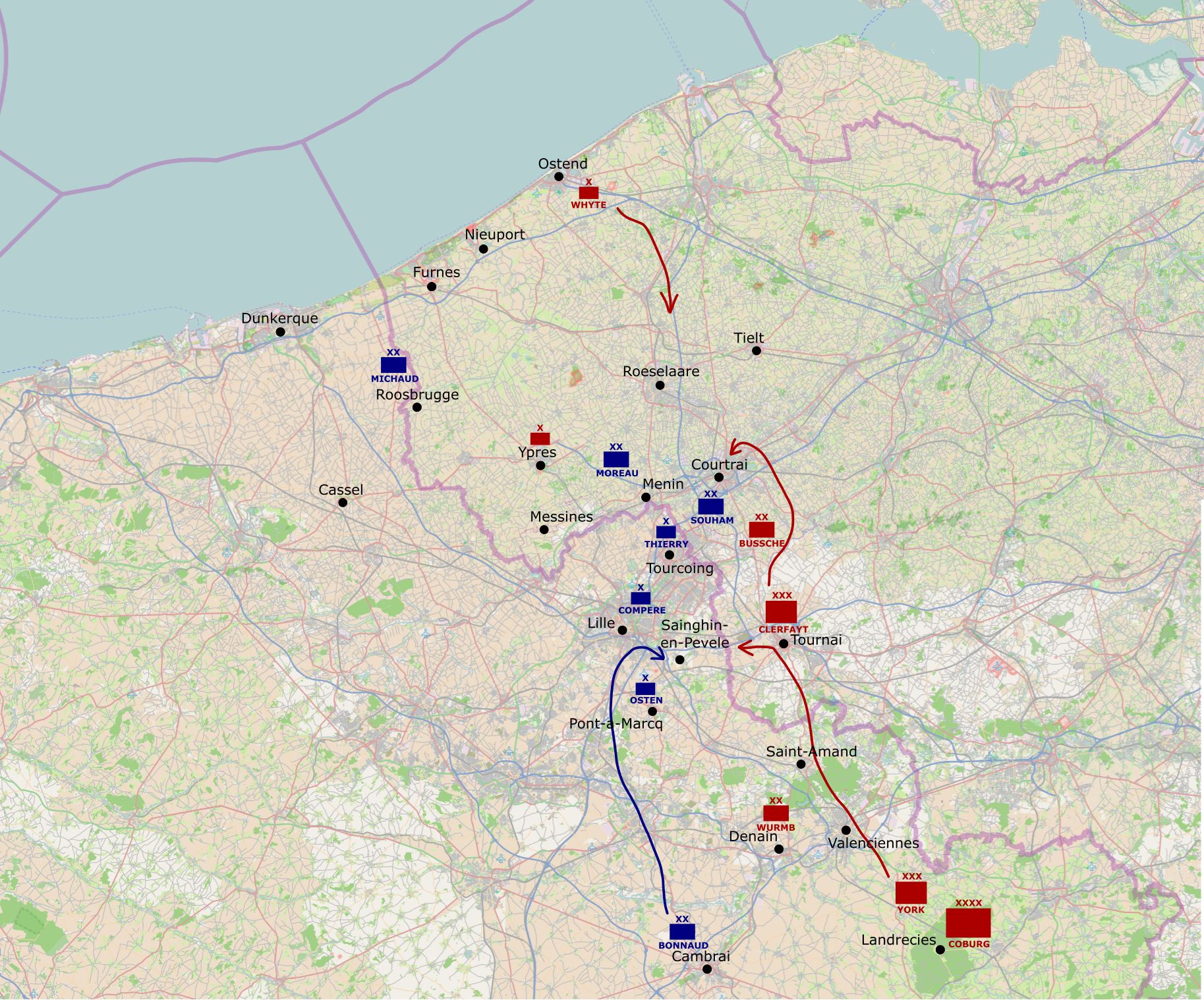
French and Allied movements prior to the battles of Willems and Courtrai. After Mouscron and the surrender of Landrecies, Coburg sends York to reinforce Clerfayt, and York decides to counterattack. However, Pichegru (who is personally absent from this part of the front during the battles) has also called in reinforcements of his own from Cambrai.

As soon as Landrecies fell, Coburg sent York with the remainder of his corps to Tournai. Heavy rains slowed York's column so that it was 3 May before it rejoined Erskine's force at Tournai. York sent a detachment west to Marquain and Lamain to relieve 5,000 of Clerfayt's soldiers who were guarding those places. Near Tournai, York's corps numbered 18,000, Clerfayt's corps counted 19,000, and Johann Ludwig, Reichsgraf von Wallmoden-Gimborn's division had 4,000–6,000 men at Warcoing. Included in Clerfayt's total was a new British brigade under Richard Whyte (12th Foot, 38th Foot, 55th Foot, and 8th Light Dragoons) that was marching from Ostend and had not yet joined.

On 5 May, the Allied corps commanders worked out a plan where Clerfayt would cross the Lys River downstream from Courtrai and attack Courtrai from the north. At the same time, York would advance west from Tournai in order to cut off Courtrai from the French base at Lille. However, Clerfayt balked and would not budge until he got direct orders from Imperial headquarters. Eventually receiving those orders, then complied. Clerfayt's force included the following Hanoverian units: 3rd and 4th Grenadier battalions, and three squadrons of the 10th Light Dragoons. His Austrian troops consisted of 2 battalions each of Infantry Regiments Clerfayt Nr. 9 and Sztáray Nr. 33, the 3rd Battalion of Infantry Regiment Stuart Nr. 18, 8 squadrons of Latour Chevau-léger Regiment Nr. 31, and the Kaiser Dragoon Regiment Nr. 3, about 8,500 soldiers.

York believed that French forces in the area numbered 24,000. In fact, Pichegru deployed 40,000–50,000 soldiers between Menin and Courtrai. Also, Pichegru ordered the 20,000-man division of Jacques Philippe Bonnaud (Chapuy's former command) to move from Cambrai to Sainghin-en-Mélantois, covering Lille. Meanwhile, Coburg sent the divisions of Franz Joseph, Count Kinsky and Archduke Charles, Duke of Teschen east toward Tournai. Other divisions under Maximilian Baillet de Latour, József Alvinczi, and Franz von Werneck went east to support Kaunitz's left wing. Coburg ordered Clerfayt to leave Tournai and attack Courtrai. Accordingly, Clerfayt set out on 8 May and crossed to the north bank of the Lys at Harelbeke. At the same time, Souham lunged toward Dottignies, but missed Clerfayt and returned to his camp at Aalbeke.

=== Willems ===
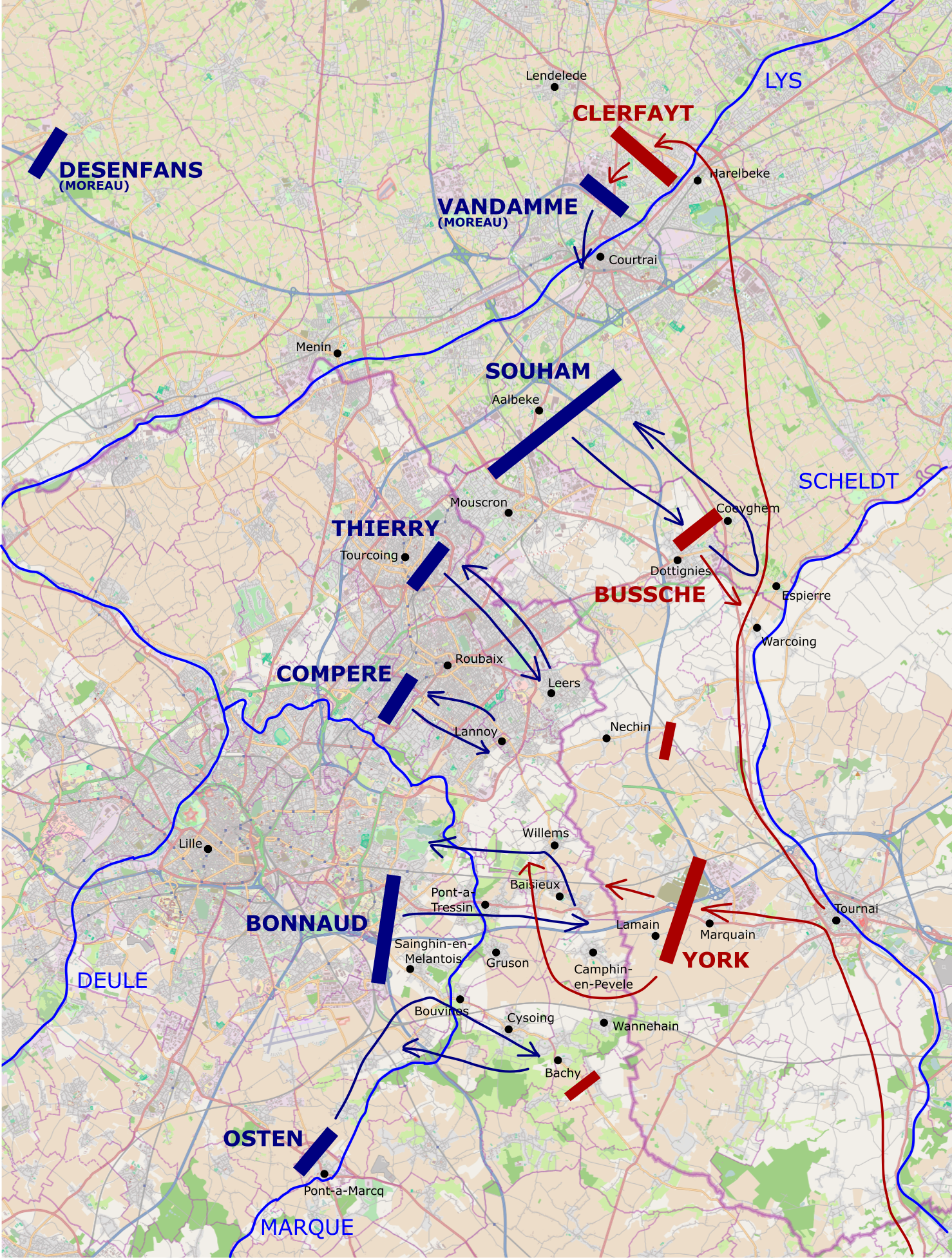
The battle of Willems, 10 May 1794

The French responded to York's and Clerfayt's advances by launching an attack on York's forces with the divisions of Souham and Bonnaud, and the brigades of Compere and Thierry--all the forces available in the area between the Scheldt and the Lys. However, Bonnaud was pushed back with loss at the battle of Willems through York's skilful use of cavalry, which led to the withdrawal of the other units involved in the offensive, as the then-prevalent cordon doctrine of warfare dictated that units of an army should advance and withdraw spread out but in line with each other, placing equal pressure on an enemy army at all points. While victorious, Willems had given York a much clearer idea of just how many French were in his front, and, realising he was badly outnumbered, he withdrew back to Tournai calling for reinforcements. York's withdrawal enabled the French to now give their full attention to Clerfayt.

== Battle ==
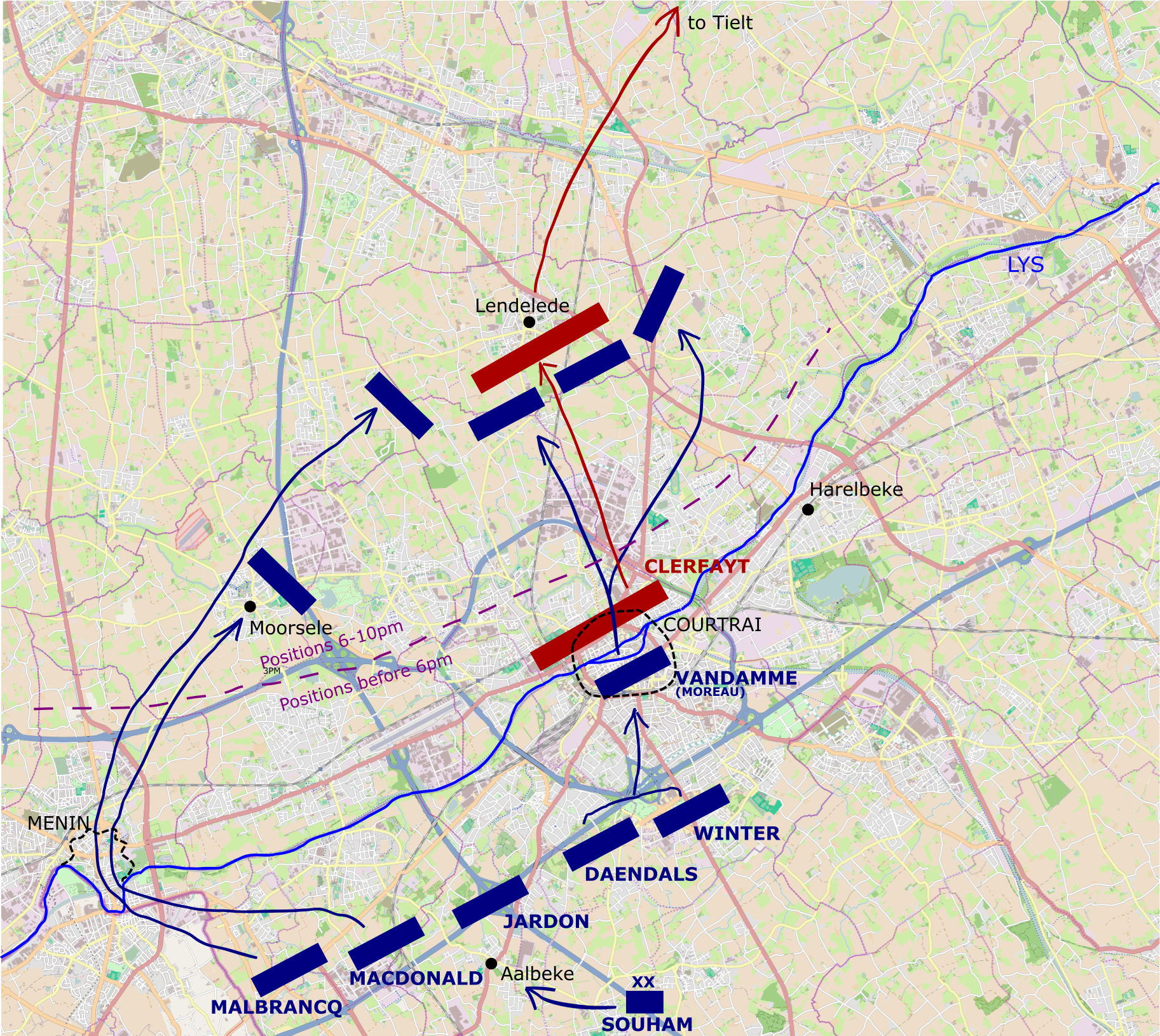
The battle of Courtrai, 11 May 1794. With York in retreat back to Tournai, Souham's division is freed to turn on Clerfayt. Reinforcing Vandamme, who was pushed back into Courtrai the previous day, and simultaneously marching to cut Clerfayt off, Souham's division pushes Clerfayt back from Courtrai, cuts him off from the rest of the Allied forces around Tournai, and forces him to retreat northwards to Tielt.

On 10 May, Clerfayt had encountered a French brigade under Dominique Vandamme, who was guarding the north bank of the Lys at Heule, and drove it back to the outskirts of Courtrai. Vandamme's brigade belonged to Moreau's division. The Coalition troops forced their way into the suburb and might have seized Courtrai itself, had Clerfayt pressed the assault. However, Clerfayt, whose leadership was often marked by hesitation and inertia, chose to stop where he was for the day.

Acting on Pichegru's orders, Souham, who had withdrawn back to Aalbeke at the end of the day after the battle of Willems, turned his division back toward Courtrai. On 11 May, Souham sent the brigades of Daendels and Winter to reinforce Vandamme at Courtrai. Meanwhile, Souham ordered the brigades of Macdonald and Malbrancq to cross the Lys at Menin, and move northeast against Clerfayt. The battle started at 3:00 pm and lasted until 10:00 pm. At first, Clerfayt's troops defended themselves stoutly, but by 6:00 pm Vandamme, Daendels, and Winter cleared their enemies from the Courtrai suburb. Soon after, Clerfayt unleashed a cavalry charge which dispersed Daendels' brigade. However, at this time Malbrancq's brigade was able to join the fighting, the bulk of which was now centred at Lendelede, 4 mi (6 km) north of Courtrai. Macdonald's brigade was unable to reach the battlefield before the end of the battle, only getting as far as Moorsele.

During the fighting, Clerfayt's left wing had been forced back, cutting his lines of communication with York. Separated from the main Allied forces to the east and pushed back from his objective by superior forces, Clerfayt acknowledged defeat at the end of the day and ordered a withdrawal toward Tielt under cover of darkness. According to one source, both sides sustained 1,200 casualties and the Austrians lost Lieutenant Field Marshal Franz Xaver von Wenckheim killed. A second source stated that Allied losses were 1,500 men and 2 guns. A third source assigned 1,500 casualties to the Allies and 1,000 casualties to the French.

== Aftermath ==
On 12 May, there was a clash at Ingelmunster as the French pursued Clerfayt's retreating column. On the French side, Vandamme employed 8,000 infantry, 1,000 cavalry, and 15 12-pounder cannons. He was opposed by the following Hesse-Darmstadt troops led by General Georg Emil von Düring: 2 companies of Jägers, the Light Infantry Battalion, Leib-Grenadiers (2nd Battalion), the Landgraf Infantry Regiment (1st Battalion), 4 squadrons of Chevau-légers, and 8 guns. The Austrians were led by Johann Rudolf von Sporck and included the Callenberg Infantry Regiment Nr. 54 (2nd Battalion), 2 battalions of the Sztáray Infantry Regiment Nr. 33, and 2 guns. The Hesse-Darmstadt troops lost 47 killed, 181 wounded, and 3 captured, plus 2 cannons. Austrian and French losses were not given. Clerfayt was joined at Ingelmunster by Whyte's British brigade which helped discourage pursuit.

Historian Ramsay Weston Phipps wondered why the Allies split their forces before the battle and sent Clerfayt north to Courtrai while York remained near Tournai. He wrote that they might have "been kept together to strike one heavy blow in the rear of the two French divisions at Courtrai and Menin". Fortescue called Clerfayt's 10 May attack on Courtrai "feeble". He criticized the British army's lack of horse artillery, which might have broken the French squares at Willems sooner and caused heavier losses. Fortescue wrote that the Austrian strategists failed to see that throwing their entire strength on one of the French wings might have crushed their enemies.

Following the battle of Courtrai, Coburg, whose main forces were still around Landrecies, was torn between concentrating on his right wing with York and Clerfayt against Pichegru, or on his left wing with Prince Kaunitz against the French forces on the Sambre river under Generals Desjardins and Charbonnier. Kaunitz's victory at the battle of Grandreng reassured Coburg, and he opted to move to Tournai, where his main army would launch another attack within a week, at the battle of Tourcoing.

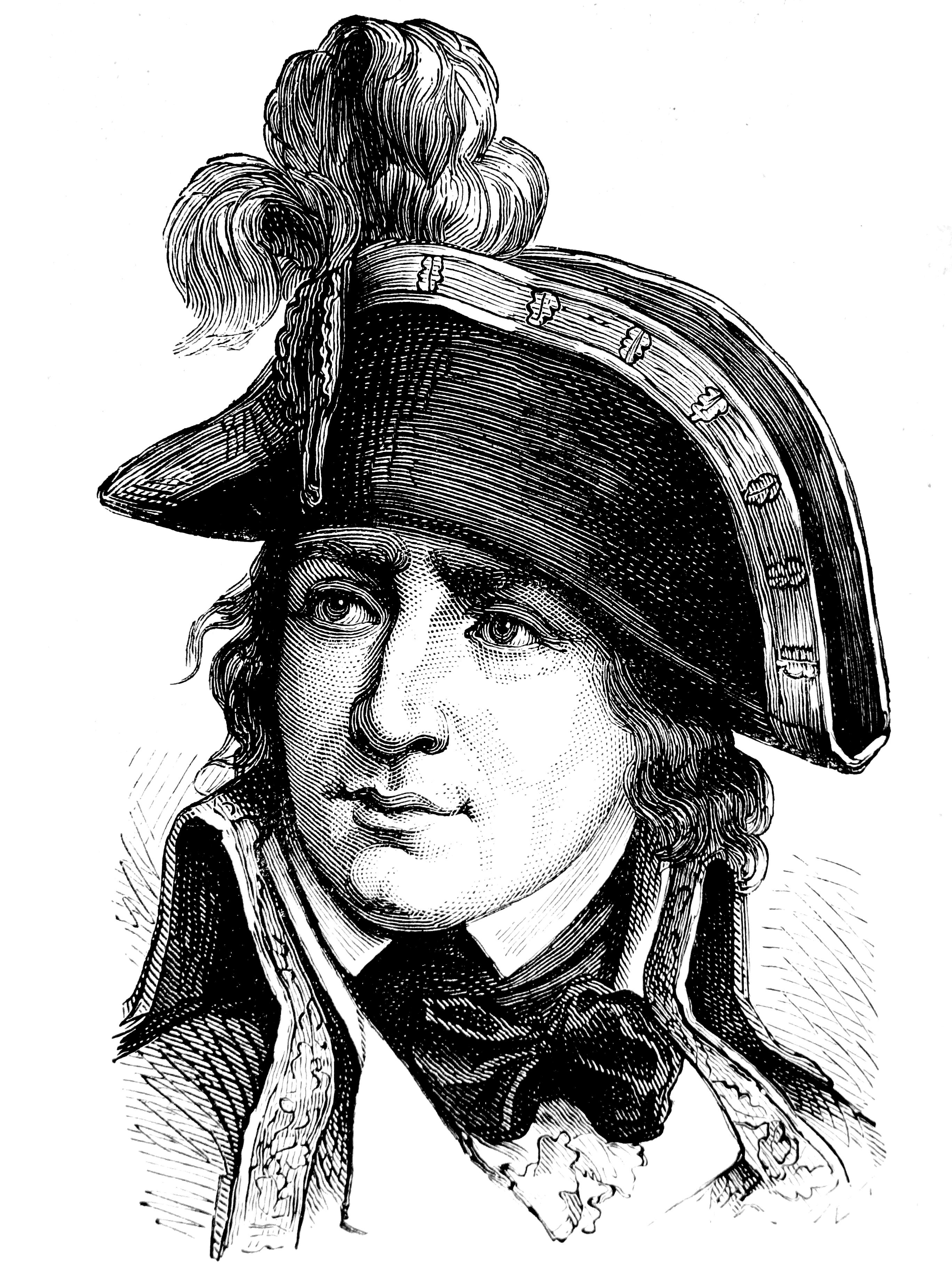
Pichegru

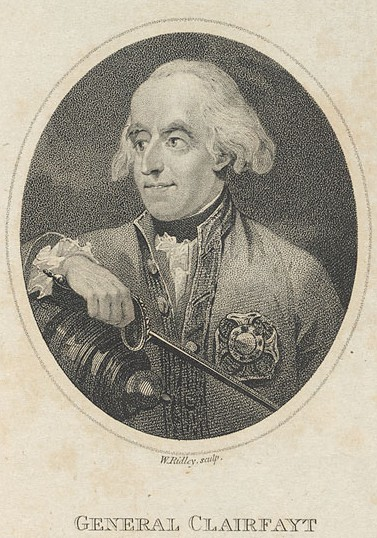
Clerfayt

== Notes ==
Footnotes

Citations
