= Battle of Lutterberg =

The Battle of Lutterberg may refer to:

- Battle of Lutterberg (1758)
- Battle of Lutterberg (1762)
