= Lamain =

Coordinates: 50°36′N 3°17′E

Lamain (French pronunciation: [lamɛ̃]; Picard: Laman) is a village of Wallonia and a district of the municipality of Tournai, located in the province of Hainaut, Belgium.
