= Marquain =

Village in Belgium

Coordinates: 50.605°N 3.322°E

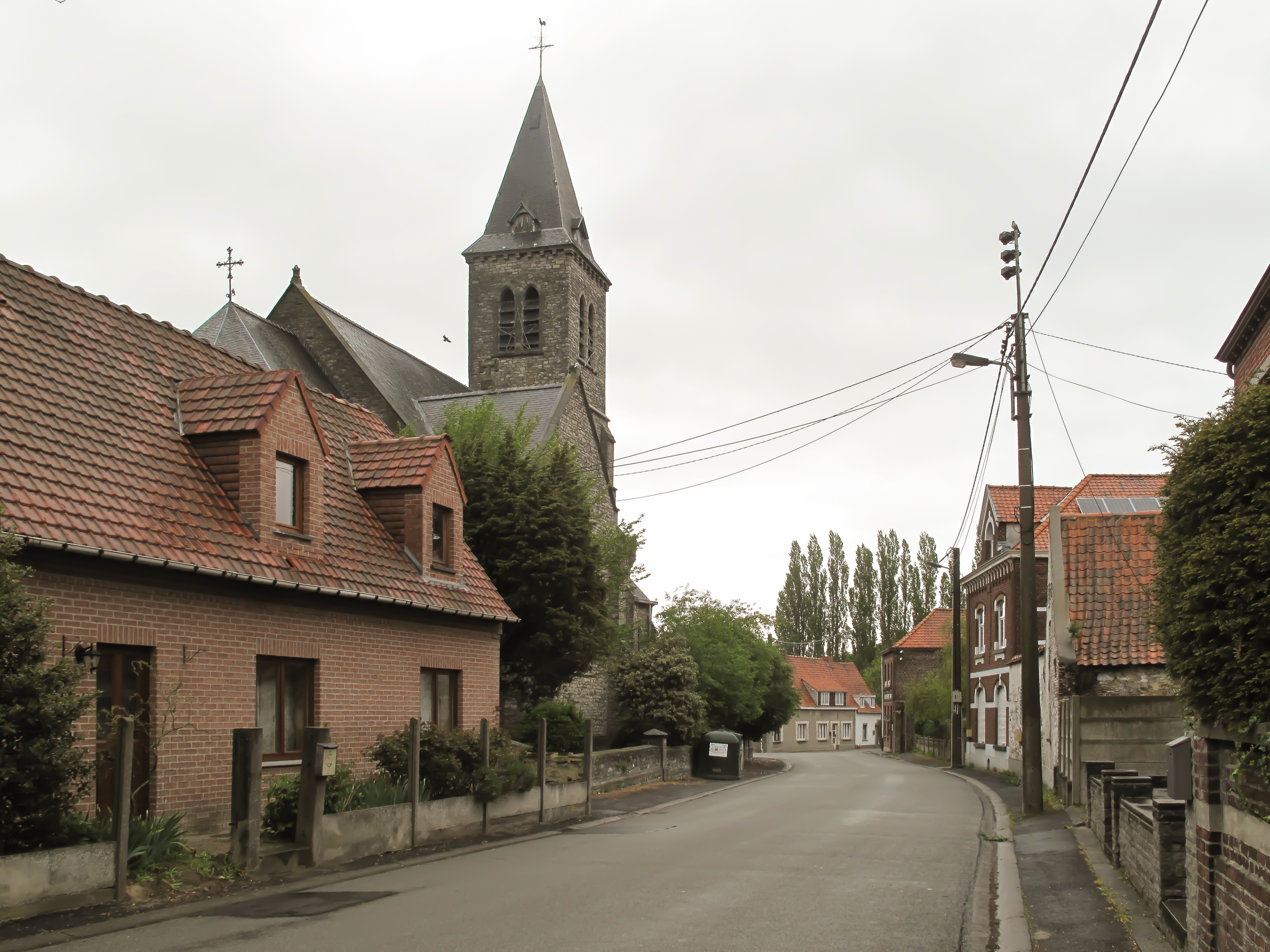
Église Saint-Amand in Marquain

Marquain (French pronunciation: [maʁkɛ̃]) is a village of Wallonia and a district of the municipality of Tournai, located in the province of Hainaut, Belgium.
