= Henri-Antoine Jardon =

French general (1768–1809)

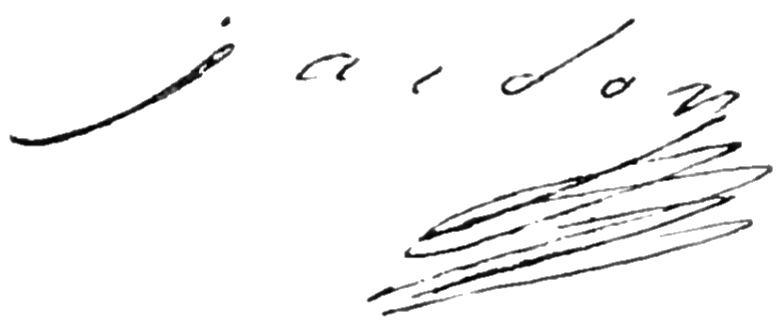
Signature

Henri-Antoine Jardon (French pronunciation: [ɑ̃ʁi ɑ̃twan ʒaʁdɔ̃]; 3 February 1768 in Verviers, Liège (today part of Belgium) – 25 March 1809, São Martin do Campo, Santo Tirso, Portugal) was a French general of brigade. He served in the French Revolutionary Wars and the Napoleonic Wars. As part of the Soult's Corps, he participated in the 2nd French invasion of Portugal in 1809, and was killed at the Battle of Braga.
