= Battle of Lutterberg (1762) =

1762 battle

Coordinates: 51.3500°N 9.5997°E

- Part of the Seven Years' War
Date	19 July 1762
Location	Lutterberg, Germany
Result	Allied victory

Belligerents
(Duchy of Brunswick) Brunswick; Great Britain	France; Saxony

Commanders and leaders
(Province of Hanover) Duke of Brunswick	(Kingdom of France) Comte de Lusace

Strength
11,500	Unknown

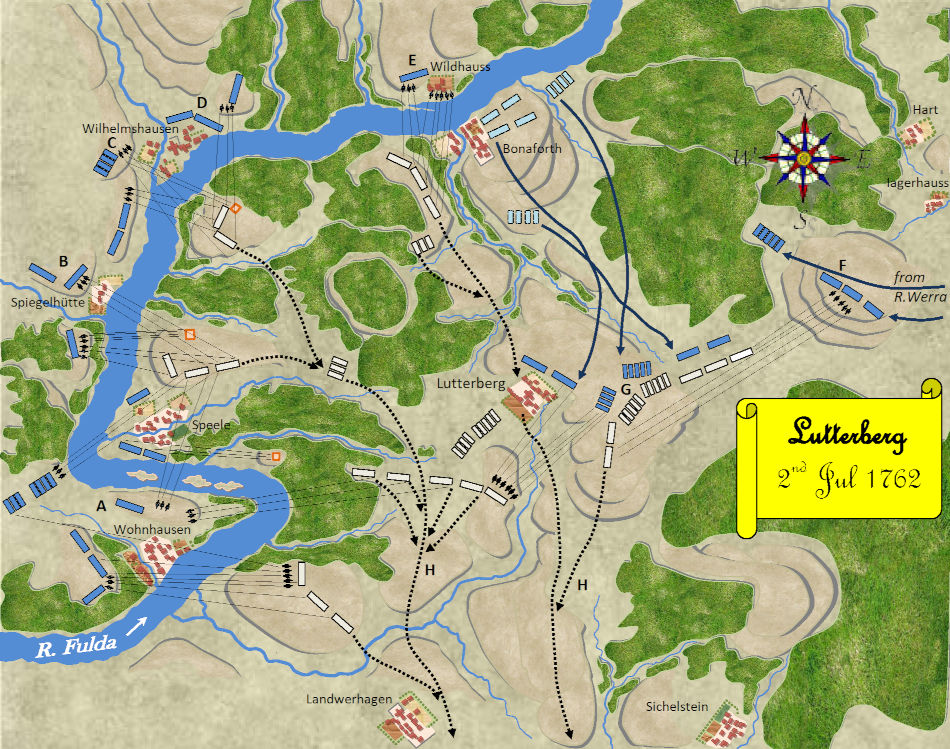
Map of battle

In the Second Battle of Lutterberg (19 July 1762), the Franco-Saxon contingent under General the Comte de Lusace were defeated by Prince Ferdinand.
