= Aalbeke =

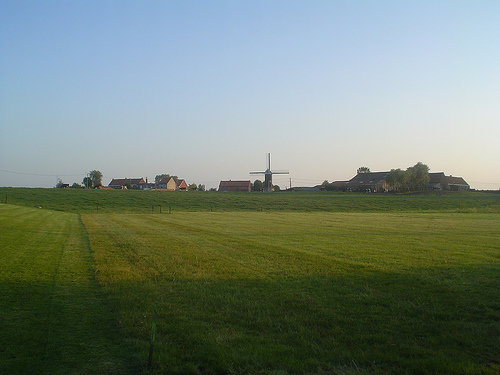

- Coat of arms

- Location in Belgium
- Coordinates: 50°46′N 3°13′E
- Country: Belgium
- Province: West Flanders
- Municipality: Kortrijk

Area
  - Total: 2.77 sq mi (7.17 km^{2})

Population (2007)
  - Total: 2,953
- Time zone: UTC+1 (CET)
  - Summer (DST): UTC+2 (CEST)
- Postal code: 8501
- Area code: 056
- Website: www.kortrijk.be

Aalbeke is a village in the Belgian province of West Flanders and since 1977 a part of Kortrijk. Aalbeke has 8511 as a postal code and covers an area of 717 ha. The district had 2,953 inhabitants on December 31, 2007.

Aalbeke is located 6 km southwest of the central area of Kortrijk and is surrounded by Rollegem, Mouscron, Lauwe and Marke. Nearby Aalbeke, the interchange of the E17 and E403 is located.

== Mayors ==
- Jacob van de Kerckhove (1679–1699)
- Willem de Schynckele (1699–1706)
- Joost Cannaert (1706–1717)
- Cornelius van den Bulcke (1717–1734)
- Noël de Praetere (1734–1740)
- Jan Lesaege (1748–1755)
- Pieter Cannaert (1755–1761)
- Jan van den Bulcke (1761–1763)
- Jan-Baptist de Kimpe (1763–1775)
- Pieter Cannaert (1775–1789)
- Antoon-Frans Lienaert (1789–1792)
- Jan de Kimpe (1792–1798)
- Pieter Lerouge (1798–1808)
- Jan-Baptist Cannaert (1808–1815)
- Jan-Jacob Cottignies (1815–1829)
- Joseph-Bernard Berton (1829–1842)
- Honoré Dufaux (1843–1852)
- Pieter-Jan Margo (1852–1857)
- Victor Pycke (1858–1868)
- Jean-Louis Mullier (1868–1895)
- Henri Bonte (1896–1931)
- Henri Castel (1931–1932)
- Edward Torreele (1933–1939)
- Alphons Ovaere (1942–1944)
- René Bonte (1944–1946)
- Georges Gheysen (1946)
- René Vanhoenackere (1947–1964)
- Georges Neirynck (1965–1976)
