= Étienne Macdonald =

French military leader (1765–1840)

Marshal of the Empire Étienne Macdonald duc de Tarente
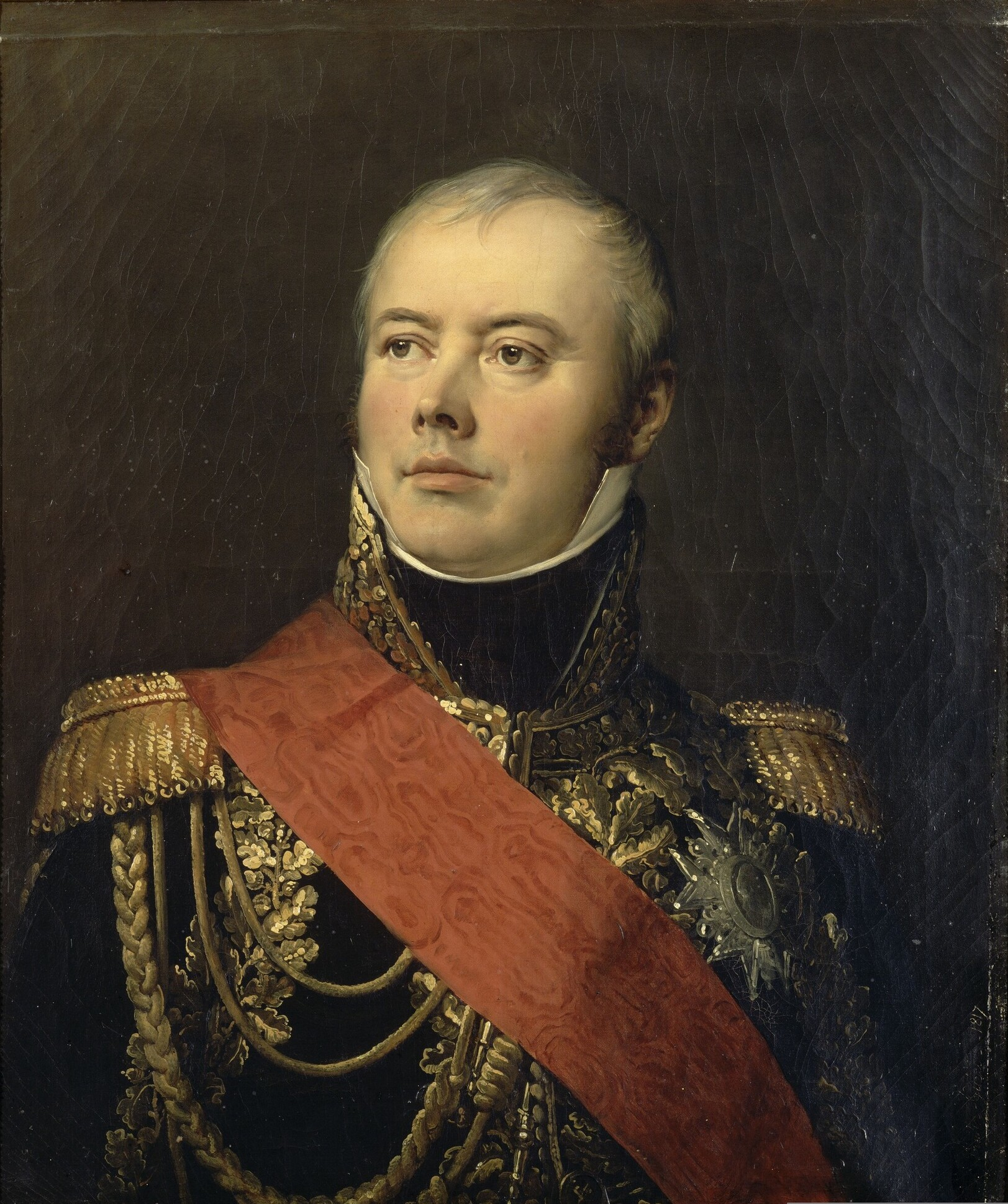
- Portrait by Antoine-Jean Gros, 1817
- Born: Étienne Jacques-Joseph-Alexandre Macdonald; 17 November 1765; Sedan, France
- Died: 25 September 1840 (aged 74); Beaulieu-sur-Loire, France
- Military career
- Branch: French Army
- Service years: 1785–1830
- Rank: Marshal of the Empire
- Conflicts: See list: French Revolutionary Wars; War of the First Coalition; Battle of Jemappes; Battle of Courtrai; Battle of Tournay; War of the Second Coalition; Battle of Civita Castellana; Battle of Otricoli; Battle of Modena; Battle of the Trebbia; Napoleonic Wars; War of the Fifth Coalition; Battle of Wagram; Peninsular War; Battle of El Pla; Siege of Figueras; Battle of Cervera; French invasion of Russia; Siege of Riga; War of the Sixth Coalition; German campaign of 1813; Battle of Lützen; Battle of Bautzen; Battle of the Katzbach; Battle of Leipzig; Northeast France Campaign; Battle of Bar-sur-Aube; Battle of Laubressel
- Awards: Grand Cross of the Legion of Honour
- Other work: Chancellor of the Legion of Honour

Étienne Jacques-Joseph-Alexandre Macdonald, 1st duc de Tarente (French pronunciation: [etjɛn ʒak ʒozɛf alɛksɑ̃dʁ makdɔnald]; 17 November 1765 – 25 September 1840), was a Marshal of the Empire and military leader during the French Revolutionary Wars and Napoleonic Wars.

Born in Sedan, the son of an exiled Scottish Jacobite, Macdonald was serving in the Irish Brigade at the outbreak of the revolution. He embraced the revolutionary cause and rapidly rose through the ranks after distinguishing himself at the Battle of Jemappes, earning the rank of brigade general in 1793 and divisional general a year later. Macdonald commanded the French troops in Rome following the proclamation of the Roman Republic in 1798. In 1799, he took part in the conquest of the Kingdom of Naples, but later in the same year suffered a major defeat at the Trebbia by an Austro-Russian army under Alexander Suvorov. He supported Napoleon following the Coup of 18 Brumaire but fell out of favour due to his association with Jean Victor Marie Moreau and was forced into semi-retirement.

In 1809, Napoleon recalled Macdonald to active duty. He played a significant role in the French victory at the Battle of Wagram and was made a Marshal of France on the battlefield, and Duke of Taranto (duc de Tarente) soon after. He covered the French retreat following their decisive defeat at Leipzig and barely escaped with his life. Macdonald was made a peer of France after the Bourbon Restoration, and did not rejoin Napoleon during the Hundred Days. He was appointed chancellor of the Legion of Honour in 1815 and major general of the royal bodyguard a year later. He died in 1840 at the age of 74.

Often regarded as one of Napoleon's less capable marshals, Macdonald nevertheless had a first-ranking and successful career under the leadership of various French military commanders, including Dumouriez, Pichegru, and Napoleon.

== Family background ==
Étienne Jacques Joseph Alexandre Macdonald was born in Sedan, Ardennes, France. His father was an exiled Jacobite Army veteran and war poet named Neil MacEachen MacDonald, who had been born into Clan MacDonald of Clanranald at Howbeg in South Uist, in the Outer Hebrides of Scotland. Neil Macdonald briefly studied for the Catholic priesthood in Paris, where he had developed a fluency in the French language that later endeared him to Prince Charles Edward Stuart. Similarly to his uncle, the fellow Gaelic poet and Jacobite officer Alasdair mac Mhaighstir Alasdair, Neil Macdonald was a close relative of the far more famous Flora MacDonald, who aided the escape of Prince Charles Edward Stuart to France after the defeat of the 1745 Rising at the Battle of Culloden.

In a Gaelic poem composed, however, after his release from the Tower of London, Niall mac Eachainn mhic Sheumais, who had also risked his own life to protect the hunted Prince, harshly criticized his cousin Flora MacDonald. Flora, he alleged, had carefree steps and accordingly sought to curry favor with both the Stuarts and Hanoverians at the same time, instead of making a choice and sticking with it. In contrast, Neil not only vowed his own forever loyalty to the Prince, but followed him into exile in France, where he married into the nobility. In the late 1820s, a partial manuscript of Mac Echainn's, "fluent charming, and undoubtedly genuine narrative of the prince's sojourn in the Hebrides", during the rising's aftermath resurfaced in the hands of a Paris barber who claimed to be his illegitimate son. Marshal MacDonald, who had just visited South Uist seeking to research his genealogy in 1825, had been unaware of the manuscripts existence.

== Military life ==
In 1784, Macdonald joined the Irish Legion, raised to support the revolutionary party in the Dutch Republic against the Kingdom of Prussia and was made lieutenant on 1 April 1785. After it was disbanded, he received a commission in Dillon's Regiment, Irish Brigade of the French Royal Army. At the start of the French Revolution, the regiment of Dillon remained loyal to the King, except for Macdonald, who was in love with Mlle Jacob, whose father was an enthusiastic revolutionary. After his marriage on 5 May 1791, on 17 August 1792 he was promoted to captain, and on 29 August 1792 he was appointed aide-de-camp to General Charles François Dumouriez. He distinguished himself at the Battle of Jemappes, and was promoted to lieutenant colonel on 12 November 1792 and then colonel on 8 March 1793.

He refused to defect to the Austrians with Dumouriez and as a reward was made général de brigade on 26 August 1793 and appointed to command the leading brigade in Pichegru's invasion of the Netherlands; Macdonald fought at Courtrai and Tournay in 1794. His knowledge of the country proved useful, and he was instrumental in the capture of the Dutch fleet by French hussars in January 1795.

In 1797, having been made général de division back in November 1794, he now served first in the Army of the Rhine and later in the Army of Italy as of 24 April 1798. When he reached Italy in 1798, the Treaty of Campo Formio had been signed on 18 October 1797, and Bonaparte had returned to France; but, under the direction of Berthier, Macdonald occupied Rome in the 1798-1799 Roman Republic, of which he was made governor on 19 November 1798, and then in conjunction with Championnet he defeated General Mack at the Battle of Ferentino, the Battle of Otricoli, the 5 December 1798 Battle of Civita Castellana, and two military affairs, first at Calvi Risorta and then on 3 January 1799 at Capua, and then by 10 January 1799, he had resigned his Office due to disagreements with Championnet. However, despite any differences, the men managed to conquer the 1282-1799 Kingdom of Naples, which then became known as the Parthenopaean Republic.

Imperial Russian Army General Suvorov invaded northern Italy in March 1799 with an Austro-Russian army, and was undoing the conquests of Bonaparte and defeated Moreau at Cassano and San Giuliano. In response Macdonald moved northwards in command of the Armée de Naples. With 35,000 men, he attacked Suvorov's 22,000 men at the Trebbia. After three days' fighting, receiving no help from Moreau, he was utterly defeated and retreated to Genoa. Later, he was made governor of Versailles and acquiesced, even if he did not participate, in the events of the 18 Brumaire.

In 1800, he received command of the army in the Helvetic Republic, maintaining communications between the armies of Germany and of Italy. He carried out his orders diligently, and in the winter of 1800–01, he was ordered to march over the Splügen Pass at the head of the Army of the Grisons. This achievement is described by Mathieu Dumas, his chief of staff. It is sometimes considered as noteworthy as Bonaparte's passage of the St Bernard before the Battle of Marengo, although Macdonald did not fight a battle.

On his return to Paris, Macdonald married the widow of General Joubert, and was appointed French ambassador to Denmark. Returning in 1805, he was associated with Moreau and thus incurred the dislike of Napoleon, who did not include him in his first creation of marshals. It was for the same reason that Napoleon did not give him a military command between 1803 and 1809.

== Under Napoleon ==
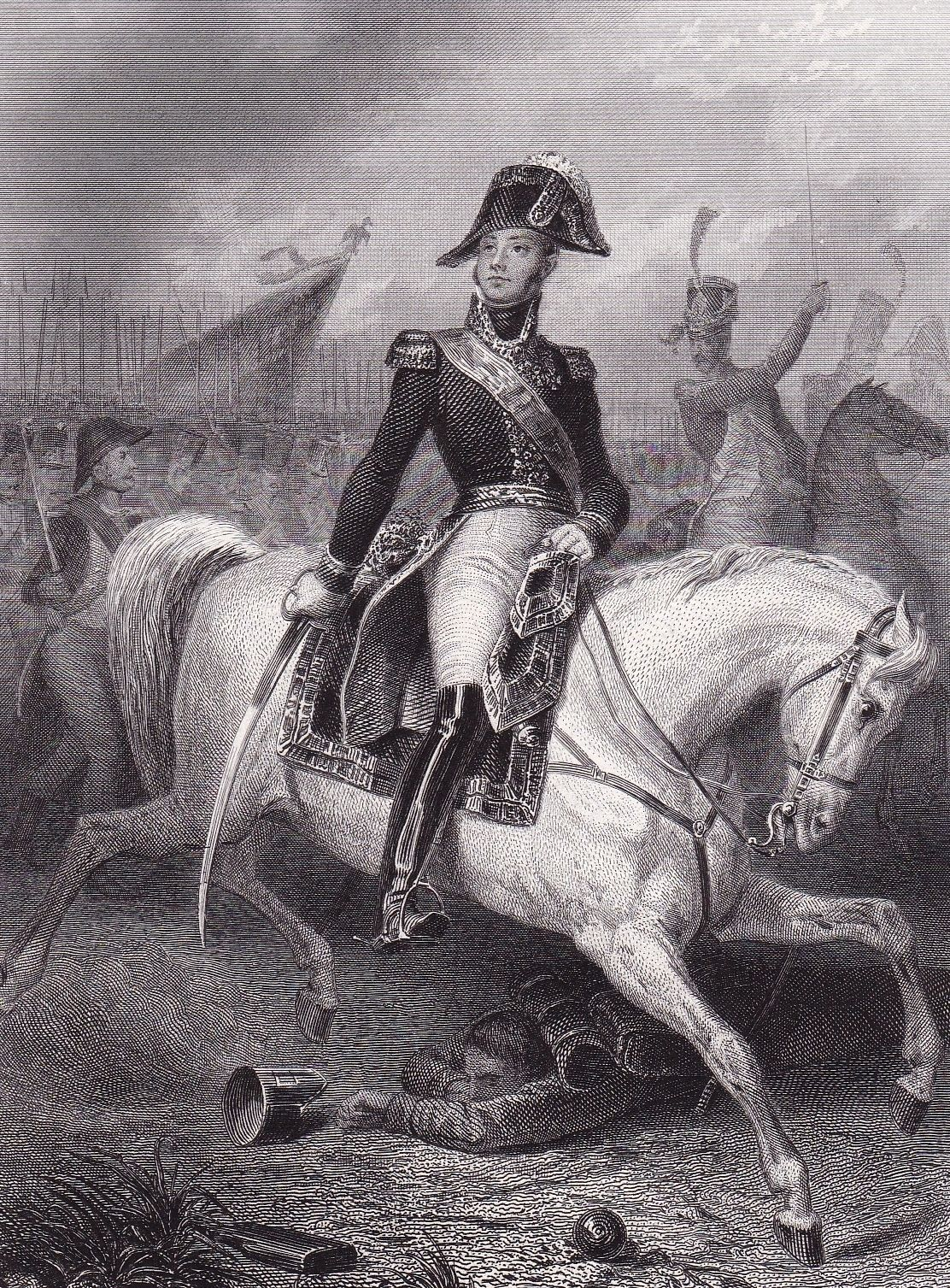
Serving throughout the French Revolutionary and Napoleonic Wars, Macdonald led major formations in the 1809 campaign against Austria, in Spain (1810–1811), Russia (1812), Germany (1813), and in France (1814).

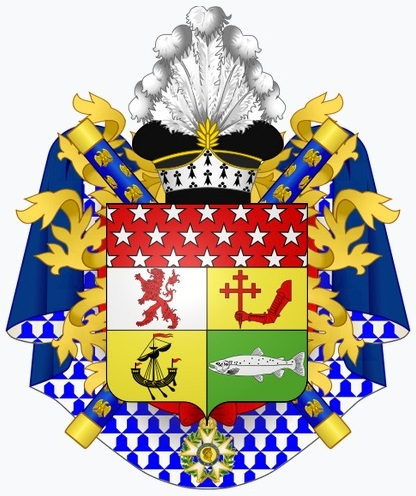
Heraldic achievement of Macdonald as duc de Tarente

He remained without employment until 1809, but then Napoleon made him military adviser to Prince Eugène de Beauharnais, viceroy of the Kingdom of Italy and the commander of the Army of Italy. After meeting an unexpected defeat at Aspern-Essling, Napoleon summoned Eugène's army north to join him, with Macdonald in tow. On the second day of Wagram, amid great pressure along the entire front, Napoleon ordered Macdonald to launch a desperate counterattack on the enemy centre. Macdonald promptly organised a gigantic three-sided open-backed infantry square, covered by Nansouty's cavalry, and hurled it against the Austrian lines. Despite sustaining terrible casualties from the Austrian artillery, this bold attack broke the Austrian centre and won the day.

After the battle, having rushed to find him on the corpse-strewn battlefield, Napoleon told Macdonald, "You have behaved valiantly...On the battlefield of your glory, where I owe you so large a part of yesterday's success, I make you a Marshal of France. You have long deserved it." Additionally, Napoleon soon after ennobled him as duc de Tarente (Duke of Taranto) in the Kingdom of Naples.

In 1810, Macdonald served in Spain and in 1812, he commanded the left wing of the Grande Armée for the invasion of Russia. He was sent to the north but did not succeed in occupying Riga. In 1813, after participating in the battles of Lützen and Bautzen, he was ordered to invade Silesia, where Blücher defeated him with great loss at Katzbach. At the Battle of Nations in 1813, his force was pushed out at Liebertwolkwitz by Johann von Klenau's IV Corps (Austrian); on a counterattack, his troops took the village back. Later that day, Klenau foiled his attempt to flank the Austrian main army, commanded by Karl Philipp, Prince of Schwarzenberg. After the Battle of Leipzig, he was ordered to cover the evacuation of Leipzig with Prince Poniatowski. After the blowing up of the last bridge over the river, he managed to swim the Elster, but Poniatowski drowned. During the defensive campaign of 1814, Macdonald again distinguished himself. He was one of the marshals sent by Napoleon to take the notice of his abdication to Paris. When all were deserting Napoleon, Macdonald remained faithful. He was directed by Napoleon to give his adherence to the new régime, and was presented with the sabre of Murad Bey for his fidelity.

== Under the Bourbons ==
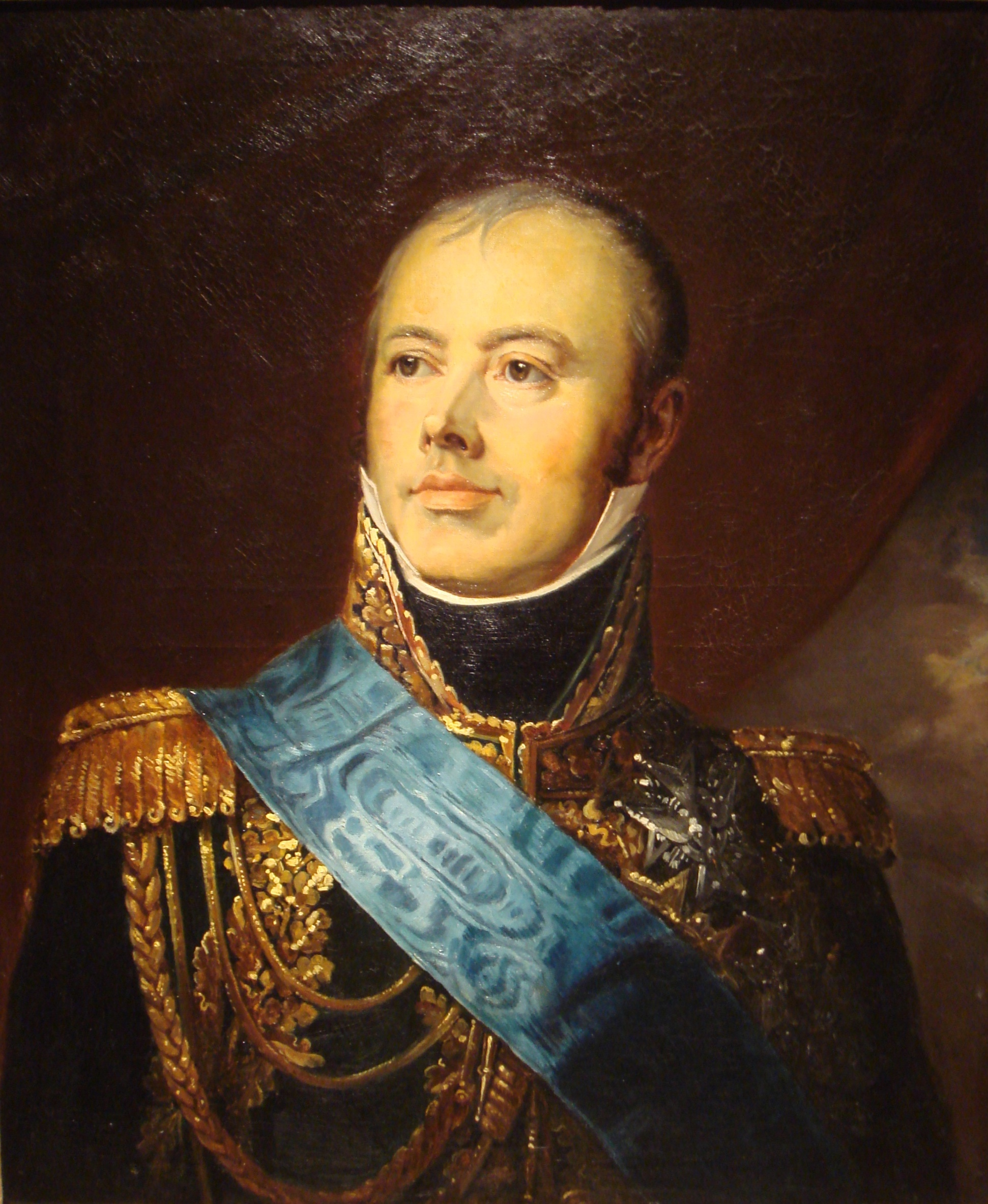
Portrait by François Gerard. The red riband of the Legion of Honour has been replaced by the blue riband of the Order of the Holy Spirit.

At the Restoration, he was made a peer of France and knight grand cross of the royal order of St. Louis; he remained faithful to the new order during the Hundred Days. In 1815, he became chancellor of the Legion of Honour, a post he held till 1831. In 1816, as major-general of the royal bodyguard, he took part in the debates of the Chamber of Peers, created under the Charter of 1814, voting consistently as a moderate Liberal. After Napoleon's abdication in 1814 Treaty of Fontainebleau (1814), Macdonald continued serving under the Bourbon monarchy. Known for speaking his mind, and never shying away from sharing his opinions, King Louis XVIII gave him the nickname "His Outspokenness".

From 1830, he lived in retirement at his country home, the Chateau de Courcelles-le-Roy in Beaulieu-sur-Loire commune, Loiret, where he died on 25 September 1840, aged 74.

== Personal life ==
In 1791, he married Marie-Constance Soral de Montloisir (died 1797) and had 2 daughters:

- Anne-Charlotte Macdonald (1792–1870)
- Adele-Elisabeth Macdonald (1794–1822)

In 1802, he married Felicité-Françoise de Montholon (1780–1804), the widow of General Joubert, and had a daughter:

- Alexandrine-Aimee Macdonald (1803–1869)

In 1821, he married Ernestine-Therese de Bourgoing (1789–1825) and had a son:

- Louis-Marie Macdonald, 2nd duc de Tarente (1824–1881)

== Scottish legacy ==
On 30 April 2010, a plaque was unveiled to the memory of Marshal of France Jacques Macdonald on the Outer Hebridean island of South Uist, the familial home of Macdonald. Macdonald had visited South Uist in 1825 in order to find out more about his family roots.

== Assessment ==
Macdonald was assessed in the Encyclopædia Britannica of 1911, which argued:

Macdonald had none of that military genius that distinguished Davout, Masséna and Lannes, nor of that military science conspicuous in Marmont and St Cyr, but nevertheless his campaign in Switzerland gives him a rank far superior to such mere generals of division as Oudinot and Dupont. This capacity for independent command made Napoleon, in spite of his defeats at the Trebia and the Battle of Katzbach, trust him with large commands till the end of his career. As a man, his character cannot be spoken of too highly; no stain of cruelty or faithlessness rests on him.

Military historian Gunter E. Rothenberg wrote that although he overstated his own abilities, Macdonald was an excellent commander. Richard Dunn-Pattison praised Macdonald for his "keen military insight" while A. G. MacDonell called his career a string of defeats. John M. Keefe blamed his defeat at Katzbach on a general lack of staff officers in French armies not commanded by Napoleon, arguing that Macdonald had fought successfully in the rest of his career.
