= Iron Mountain =

Iron Mountain(s) may refer to:

== Places ==
=== Czech Republic ===
Ranges

- Iron Mountains (Czech Republic) / Železné hory, a mountain ridge in Chrudim District in the middle of Czech Republic

=== United States ===
Communities

- Iron Mountain, Michigan, a city
- Iron Mountain, Missouri, a community and historic mining area in St. Francois County
- Farthing, Wyoming, also known as Iron Mountain
- Iron Mountains (California)
- Camp Iron Mountain California

Mines

- Iron Mountain Mine, a toxic mine and Superfund site near Redding, California
- Iron Mountain District, a series of magnetite and hematite deposits in southwestern Utah

Summits

- Iron Mountain (Los Angeles County), California
- Iron Mountain (Madera County, California)
- Iron Mountain (Napa County, California)
- Iron Mountain (Sangre de Cristo Range), southern Colorado
- Iron Mountain (Never Summer Mountains), northern Colorado
- Iron Mountain (Florida)
- Iron Mountain (Idaho)
- Iron Mountain (Oregon)
- Iron Mountain (South Dakota)
- Iron Mountain (Utah)
- Iron Mountain (Jefferson County, Washington), Olympic Mountains
- Iron Mountain (Pierce County, Washington), Mount Rainier National Park

Ranges

- Iron Mountains, a sub-range of the Appalachian Mountains in Tennessee, Virginia, and North Carolina
- Iron Mountains (California), in the Mojave Desert

== Other uses ==
- Iron Mountain (company), specializing in records management
- Iron Mountain (riverboat), a Mississippi riverboat
- The Report from Iron Mountain, a fictional satire about think tanks and war planning
- Pine Mountain Jump, site of the Iron Mountain leg of the FIS Ski Jumping World Cup

== See also ==
- Iron Hill (disambiguation)
- Ore Mountains (disambiguation)
