= Iron Hill =

Iron Hill may refer to:

- Iron Hill, Quebec, Canada
- Iron Hill (Delaware), a hill near Newark, Delaware, U.S.
- Iron Hill, Pennsylvania, U.S.
- Iron Hill Bridge, Bucks County, Pennsylvania, U.S.

== Other uses ==
- Iron Hill Brewery & Restaurant, a restaurant chain founded in Delaware
- Iron Hills, in J. R. R. Tolkien's Middle-earth
- Iron Hills Conference, an athletic conference in New Jersey

== See also ==
- Iron Mountain (disambiguation)
