= Pencader Hundred =

Unincorporated area in Delaware, US

Pencader Hundred is a hundred in western New Castle County, Delaware. It was formed in 1710 from parts of New Castle Hundred, Christiana Hundred and Red Lion Hundred. Its boundaries include sections of the Christiana River and the Chesapeake and Delaware Canal, while its western boundary follows the Delaware state line established after the Mason–Dixon line was surveyed in 1767.

The hundred lies mostly on the coastal plain of the Delmarva Peninsula, with part of the Piedmont extending into its northwestern corner. Parts of Newark and the Glasgow census-designated place are within Pencader Hundred. Major roads crossing the area include Interstate 95, U.S. Route 40 and Delaware Route 896.

== Boundaries and formation ==
Pencader Hundred is that portion of western New Castle County that lies south and west of the Christiana River, north of the Chesapeake and Delaware Canal, and generally west of Salem Church Road and Red Lion Road (DE Route 71). It also includes a large area north and east of the Christiana River generally from the old Pennsylvania Railroad tracks to Cooch's Bridge, as well as another small area south of the Chesapeake and Delaware Canal, west of Summit Bridge and north of Back Creek. Finally, it excludes the small area west of the Christiana River immediately west of Newark. It was formed from portions of New Castle Hundred, Christiana Hundred and Red Lion Hundred in 1710.

Originally, the default boundary of Delaware and Maryland was the vague height of land between the Delaware River and Chesapeake Bay drainage basins and Pencader Hundred extended only to that point. With the running of the Mason–Dixon line in 1767, the western boundary of Delaware was established in its present location and became Pencader Hundred's western boundary. A portion of the city of Newark and the Glasgow Census Designated Place (CDP) is in Pencader Hundred.

== Development ==
Pencader Hundred is rural and agricultural in places, but there has been considerable residential and commercial development in the 1980s and 1990s which continues to this day. This area is among the fastest growing parts of Delaware.

== Geography ==
Important geographical features, in addition to the Chesapeake and Delaware Canal, Christiana River, and Back Creek, include Five Mile Run, Chestnut Hill and Iron Hill. It is mostly in the coastal plain region on the Delmarva Peninsula, but an extension of the piedmont in the northwest corner provides a couple of prominent hills to the area.

== Transportation ==
Important roads include portions of Interstate 95, the Pulaski Highway (U.S. Route 40), Summit Bridge Road (Delaware Route 896), and the old main highway between Wilmington and Baltimore, now Old Baltimore Pike. A portion of the old Delaware Railroad, subsequently the Delmarva branch of the Pennsylvania Railroad runs north–south at the eastern edge. The old Newark-Delaware City railroad, now Norfolk Southern Railway's Delmarva Secondary, crosses the northeastern corner.

== Attractions ==
- The Pencader Heritage Museum shares local history of the area.
- Poplar Hall is a historic landmark with a pumpkin patch.
- Cooch's Bridge, the site of the Battle of Cooch's Bridge
