= Iron Hill Brewery & Restaurant =

Brewery founded in 1996 in Newark, Delaware

- Location: Newark, Delaware, United States
- Opened: 1996
- Closed: 2025
- Key people: Kevin Finn, Mark Edelson, Kevin Davies
- Website: https://www.ironhillbrewery.com/

Iron Hill Brewery & Restaurant was a craft brewery and scratch restaurant chain founded in 1996 in Newark, Delaware. All locations closed in September 2025.

== History ==
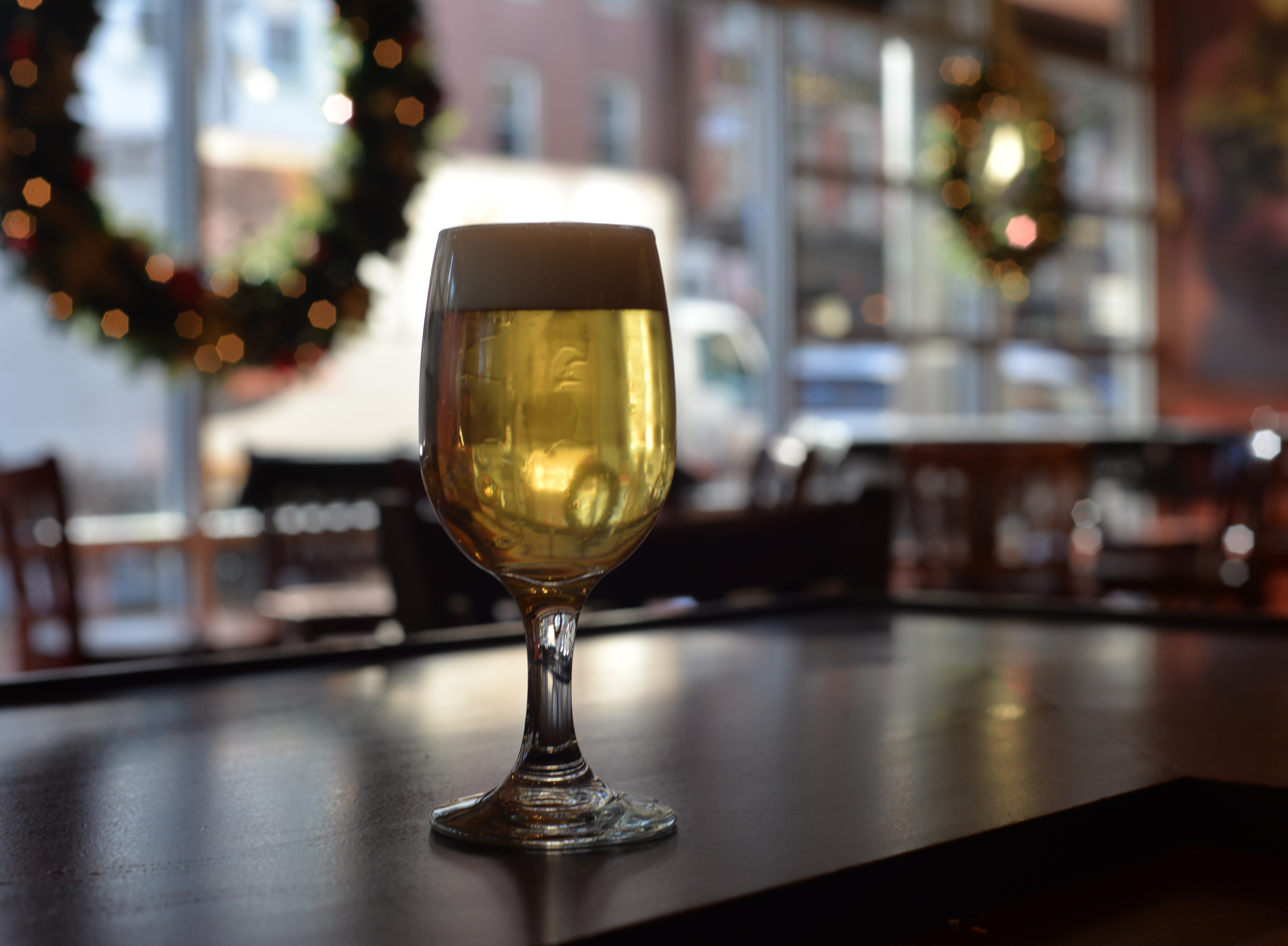
One of Iron Hill Brewery's signature beers, Iron Hill Light Lager.

Iron Hill was founded in 1996 by Kevin Finn, Mark Edelson, and Kevin Davies. Soccer friends Finn and Edelson enjoyed home brewing in the early 1990s; their love of beer inspired the duo to create a business plan for a future brew pub.

Finn and Edelson began raising money, researching the restaurant industry, and visiting potential sites for a brew pub in the early 1990s. Eventually, the two invited Kevin Davies, a career restaurateur, as a third partner in their venture. Finn acquired money through family and an SBA loan to open the first Iron Hill Brewery & Restaurant on Main Street in Newark, Delaware.

The team estimated that the Newark restaurant would produce $2 million in sales within the first year; however, its success in the college-centric town produced an extra million in revenue, largely attributed to food sales.

In 1998, Iron Hill opened a second location in West Chester, Pennsylvania. In May 2018, the restaurant opened its first location in the Southern U.S., in Greenville, South Carolina. Iron Hill launched the “20 for 20” initiative, aiming to have 20 locations open in 2020, including a restaurant in Atlanta, Georgia.

In January 2025, Iron Hill appointed a new CEO, Mark Kirke, for the first time in its history. On September 10, 2025, the company announced the closure of three locations: in Voorhees, New Jersey; Chestnut Hill, Pennsylvania; and Newark, Delaware, the latter being its flagship store.

Less than a month later, on October 6, 2025, Iron Hill filed for Chapter 7 bankruptcy, citing ongoing financial difficulties. The filing resulted in the closure of all remaining locations.

In April 2026, under new management, Iron Hill Brewery was reopened, starting with its location in Center City Philadelphia.

=== Origin of Iron Hill name and brand ===
Finn discovered the geographic landmark, Iron Hill, in a Delaware book of maps, which explained the site's rich historical background. Finn, Edelson, and Davies chose the company's name after discovering that Iron Hill is considered the highest hill in Delaware and was the site of a significant battle during the Revolutionary War known as the Battle of Cooch's Bridge.

The company's mark is a bird holding barley and hops, which represents two main ingredients found in beer.

== Products and Awards ==
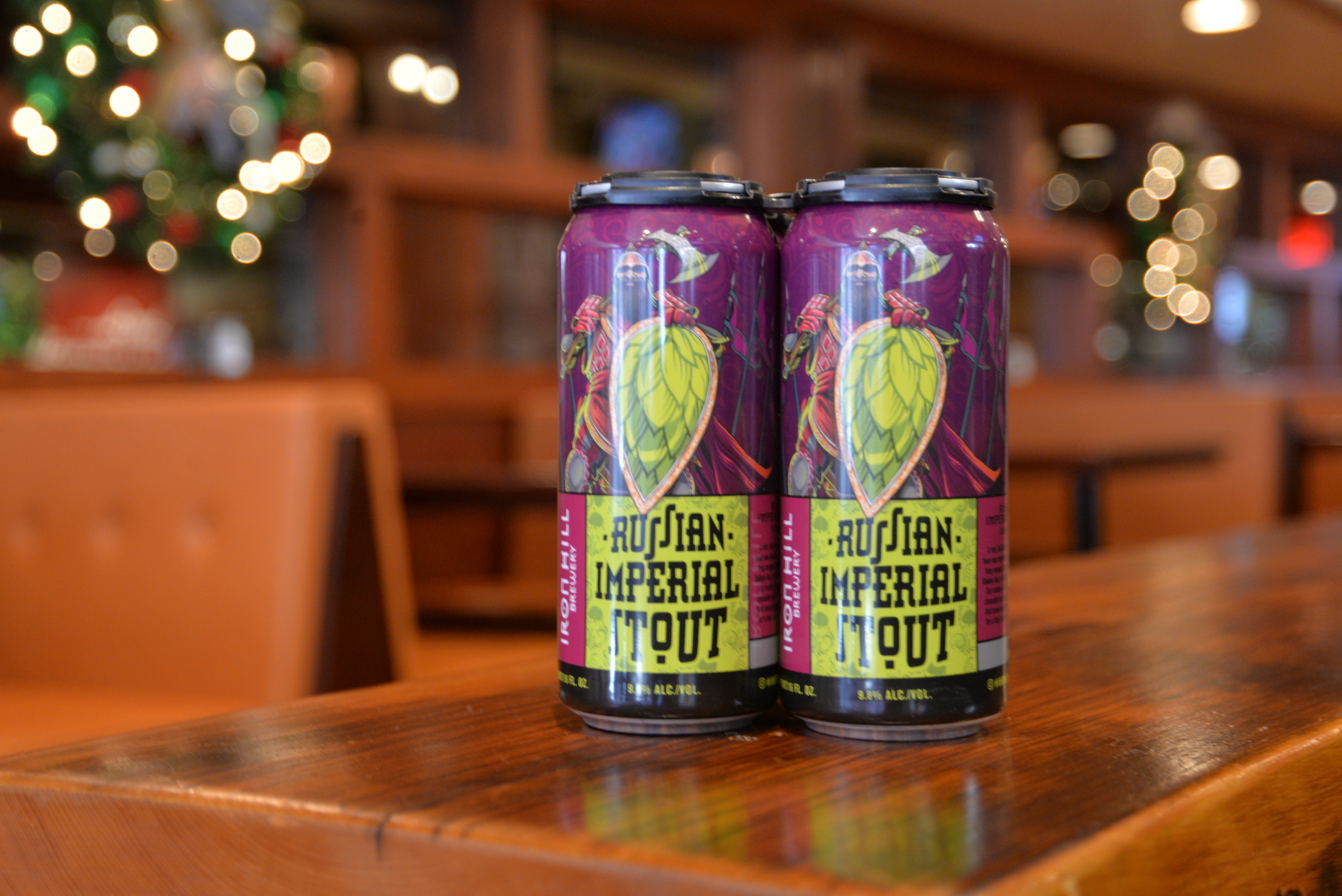
A 4-pack of Iron Hill Brewery & Restaurant's most award-winning beer, Russian Imperial Stout.

Iron Hill Brewery exclusively served its own beers and offered new American cuisine. Each location brewed a variety of beers that were influenced by the season. The brewery's goal was to focus on small batches of beer that are creative and in line with desirable styles and flavors. Iron Hill has claimed 48 medals over 22 consecutive years at the Great American Beer Festival, along with several World Beer Cup and restaurant awards.
