= Pencader =

Pencader may refer to:

- Pencader, Carmarthenshire, Wales
- Pencader Hundred, an unincorporated subdivision of New Castle County, Delaware, in the United States
