= Betsy Ross flag =

Early U.S. flag design

Betsy Ross Flag
- Use: Small vexillological symbol or pictogram in black and white showing the different uses of the flag
- Adopted: 1777
- Design: Thirteen alternating red and white stripes, a blue canton with thirteen five-pointed stars arranged in a circle
- Designed by: Betsy Ross (attributed)

The Betsy Ross flag is an early design for the flag of the United States that first appeared in a painting of George Washington at Trenton by John Trumbull. This flag had red stripes outermost and stars arranged in a circle. The name, first used more than 100 years after the flag appeared in a painting, stems from the legend that a Philadelphia upholsterer, Elizabeth "Betsy" Ross, designed and produced this flag.

The design of the Betsy Ross flag conformed to the Flag Act of 1777, passed early in the American Revolutionary War, which merely specified 13 alternating red and white horizontal stripes and 13 white stars in a blue canton. Today, the flag is often used as a patriotic emblem of the American Revolution and of U.S. values more broadly. According to some historians, the Betsy Ross flag (and subsequent U.S. flag designs) still retains official status as the Flag Act of 1777 was never formally repealed by the U.S. Congress.

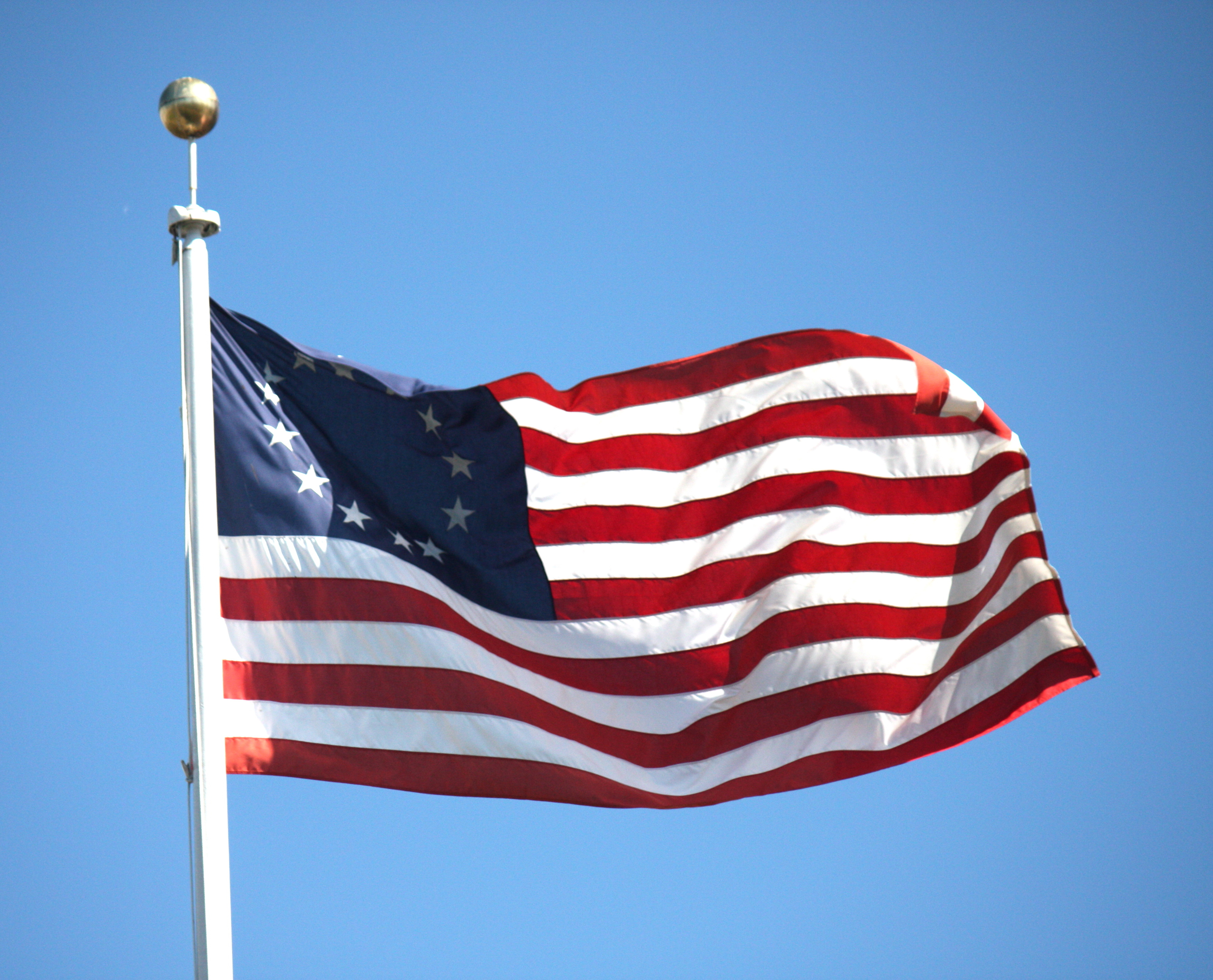
The Betsy Ross flag flying outside San Francisco City Hall, in San Francisco, California

== Betsy Ross legend ==
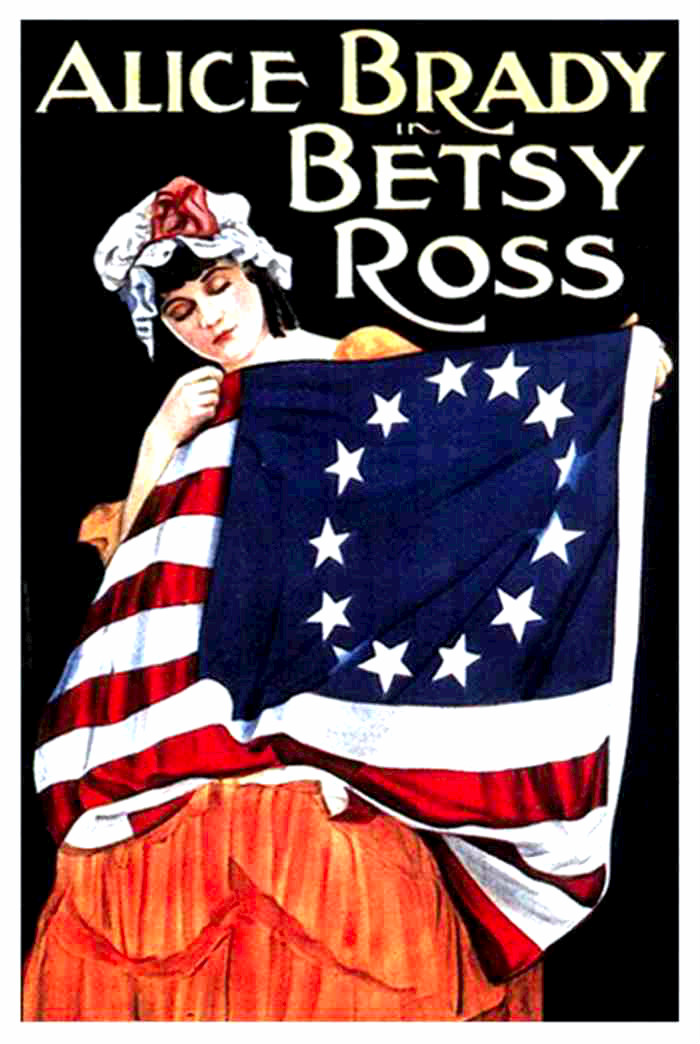
Poster for 1917 film Betsy Ross

Betsy Ross (1752–1836) was an upholsterer in Philadelphia who produced uniforms, tents, and flags for Continental forces. Although her manufacturing contributions are documented, a popular legend evolved in which Ross was hired by a group of Founding Fathers to make a new U.S. flag. According to the legend, she deviated from the six-pointed stars in the design and produced a flag with five-pointed stars instead. George Washington was a member of the Masonic lodge, and their use of the six-pointed star may have influenced Washington's choice of six-pointed stars for his headquarters flag. The claim by her descendants that Betsy Ross contributed to the flag's design is not accepted by modern American scholars and vexillologists.

Ross became a notable figure representing the contribution of women in the American Revolution, but how this specific design of the U.S. flag became associated with her is unknown. An 1851 painting by Ellie Sully Wheeler of Philadelphia displayed Betsy Ross sewing a U.S. flag. The National Museum of American History suggests that the Betsy Ross story first entered into American consciousness about the time of the 1876 Centennial Exposition celebrations.

In 1870, Ross's grandson, William J. Canby, presented a paper to the Historical Society of Pennsylvania in which he claimed that his grandmother had "made with her hands the first flag" of the United States. Canby said he first obtained this information from his aunt Clarissa Sydney Wilson (née Claypoole) in 1857, twenty years after Betsy Ross's death. In his account, the original flag was made in June 1776, when a small committee – including George Washington, Robert Morris and relative George Ross – visited Betsy and discussed the need for a new U.S. flag. Betsy accepted the job to manufacture the flag, altering the committee's design by replacing the six-pointed stars with five-pointed stars. Canby dates the historic episode based on Washington's journey to Philadelphia, in late spring 1776, a year before Congress passed the Flag Act. Ross biographer Marla Miller notes that even if one accepts Canby's presentation, Betsy Ross was merely one of several flag makers in Philadelphia, and her only contribution to the committee's design was the change in star shape from six-pointed to five-pointed.

In 1878, Col. J. Franklin Reigart published a somewhat different story in his book, "The history of the first United States flag, and the patriotism of Betsy Ross, the immortal heroine that originated the first flag of the Union." Reigart remembers visiting his great-aunt, Mrs. Betsy Ross, in 1824 during the time of General Lafayette's visit to Philadelphia. In this version, Dr. Benjamin Franklin replaces George Washington. Together with George Ross and Robert Morris, they request that Mrs. Ross design the first flag. The Canby version and the subsequent 1909 book with the Ross family affidavits never specify the arrangement of stars. Reigart, however, describes Mrs. Ross's flag with an eagle in the canton with 13 stars surrounding its head. The cover of Reigart's book shows the 13 stars in a 3-2-3-2-3 lined pattern in the canton.

The earliest connection between Betsy Ross and this flag design with 13 stars in a circle was Charles Weisgerber's 1893 painting "Birth of Our Nation's Flag." The 9 x 12-foot painting was first displayed at the 1893 Columbian Exposition in Chicago and depicts Betsy Ross with the flag on her lap. In developing his work, Weisgerber was in touch with the descendants of Betsy Ross. He would have needed a design for the flag in his painting. The most likely source of his design is the 1882 edition of History of the Flag of the United States of America by George Henry Preble, a flag scholar in the late 1800s. Preble himself did not discuss the arrangement of the stars on the 1777 design. The book's illustrators, however, did provide a flag design for the 1777 flag. The illustrators may have used the flag design from Emanuel Leutze's 1851 painting Washington Crossing the Delaware. Consequently, the editions of Preble's book in 1872, 1880, and 1882, all show the 1777 flag as having a circle of 13 stars. It is also possible that Weisgerber used a July 1873 issue of Harper's Weekly Magazine as his source to find out what a 1777 flag looked like. This article published one year after Preble's first edition, showed this flag with the label, "Flag Adopted by Congress, 1777."

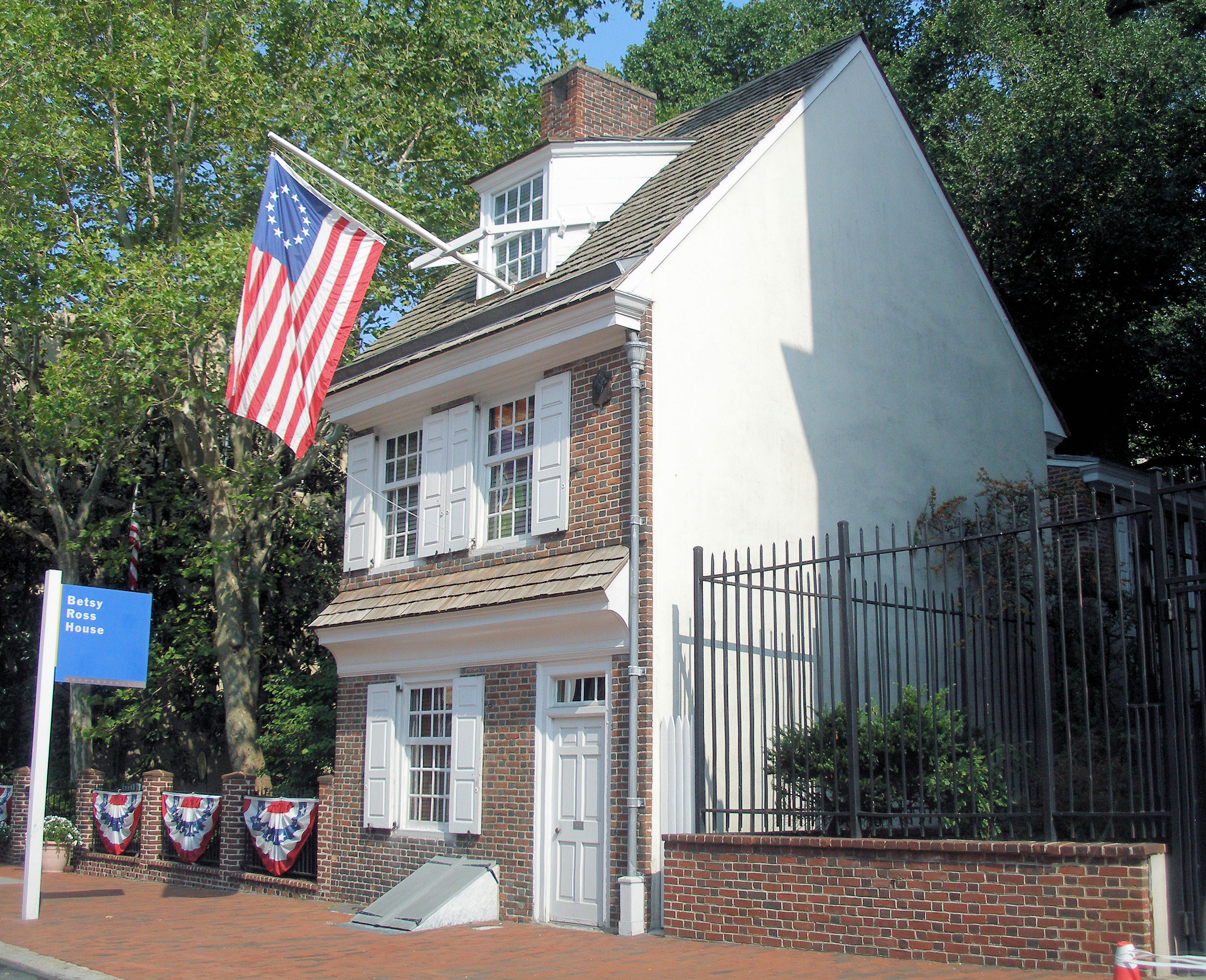
The Betsy Ross House with the flag flying out front

Weisgerber later helped start the foundation that restored 239 Arch Street in Philadelphia as the Betsy Ross House, though Ross may have actually lived in the demolished house next door. Weisgerber promoted the story of Betsy Ross by sending prints of the painting to foundation donors. It was reported in 1928 that he received donations from 4 million children and adults. In 1897, the New York City School Board approved the order of framed prints for all schools in their system.

=== Canby account ===
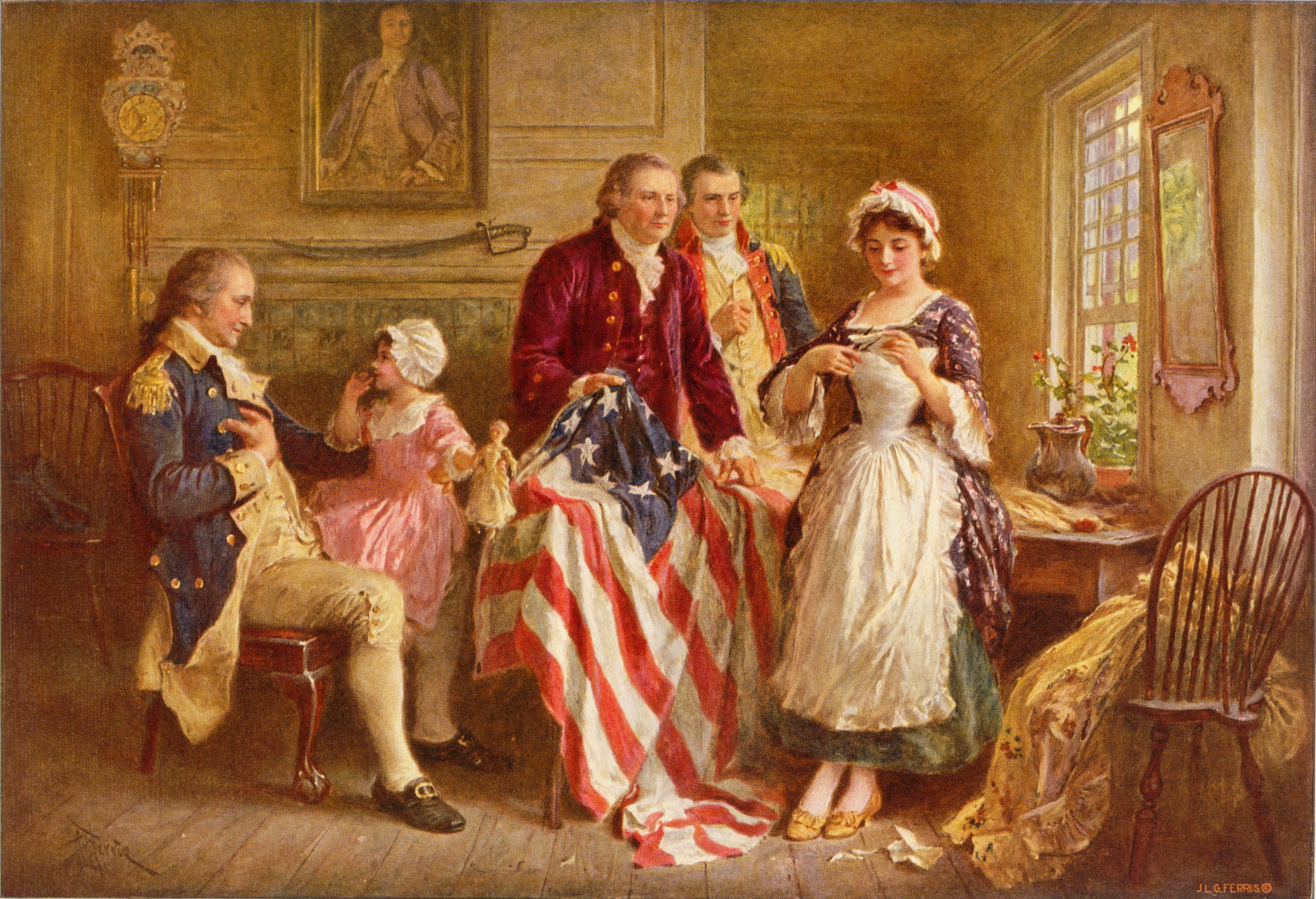
Betsy Ross 1777, a ca. 1920 depiction by artist Jean Leon Gerome Ferris of Ross showing Gen. George Washington (seated, left), Robert Morris and George Ross how she cut the revised five-pointed stars for the flag.

Ross's grandson, William Canby, publicly presented a version of her story to the Historical Society of Pennsylvania in 1870. Two years later, George Henry Preble cast doubt on Canby's report in his 1872 "Our Flag: Origin and Progress of the Flag of the United States of America. Canby's 1870 account remains popular American folklore, but has been the source of some debate. Although the account has supporters, there is a lack of historical evidence and documentation to support Canby's story. (Note: See external links for arguments for and against Canby's story.) While modern lore may exaggerate the details of her story, Canby's account of Betsy Ross never claimed any contribution to the flag design except for the five-pointed star.

Additionally, arguments against Canby's story include:

- Despite Canby's efforts, he could find no records to show that the Continental Congress had a committee to design the national flag in the spring of 1776.
- Although George Washington had been a member of the First Continental Congress, he left Congress to become commander-in-chief of the Continental Army in 1775. Therefore, it would have been impossible for him to head a congressional committee in 1776.
- In letters and diaries that have surfaced, neither George Washington, Col. Ross, Robert Morris, nor any other member of Congress mentioned anything about a national flag in 1776.
- Six-pointed stars were used in the 1782 Great Seal that was based on the 1777 flag. The stars in the Great Seal were not changed to five-pointed stars until the Seal was recast in 1841.
- The Flag Resolution of June 1777 was the first documented meeting, discussion, or debate by Congress about a national flag.
- On May 29, 1777, Betsy Ross was paid by the Pennsylvania State Navy Board for making Pennsylvania naval flags, not the Stars and Stripes.

Supporters of Canby's story defend his account with arguments including:

- Robert Morris was a business partner of John Ross, Betsy's cousin by marriage. Morris was on the Marine Committee at the time the flag vote was taken as part of Marine Committee business.
- George Washington has at least one documented transaction with John and Betsy Ross, when he bought bed hangings from them in 1774.
- George Washington was in Philadelphia in May and June 1776 for fifteen days. Subsequent to his meeting with Congress during this time, a committee was formed to confer with Washington on military options. The membership included George Read, the uncle of John Ross, late husband of Betsy Ross.
- Rachel Fletcher, Betsy Ross's daughter, gave an affidavit to the Betsy Ross story.
- A painting which might be dated 1851 by Ellie Wheeler, allegedly the daughter of Thomas Sully, shows Betsy Ross sewing the flag. If the painting is authentic and the date correct, the story was known nearly 20 years before Canby's presentation to the Historical Society of Pennsylvania.

== First flag ==
The Betsy Ross flag is featured on the seal of the U.S. Department of Veterans Affairs, together with the modern United States flag to represent veterans throughout United States history.

Canby's account and similar versions of the Betsy Ross tale often refer to this design as the first U.S. flag, but there is no consensus on what the first U.S. flag looked like, nor who produced it. There were at least 17 flag makers and upholsterers who worked in Philadelphia during the time these early American flags were made. Margaret Manny is thought to have made the first American flag, but there is no evidence to prove she also made the Stars and Stripes. Other flag makers of that period include Rebecca Young, Anne King, Cornelia Bridges, and flag painter William Barrett. Hugh Stewart sold a "flag of the United Colonies" to the Committee of Safety, and William Alliborne was one of the first to manufacture United States ensigns. Any flag maker in Philadelphia could have sewn the first American flag. Even according to Canby, there were other variations of the flag being made at the same time Ross was sewing the design that would carry her name. If true, there may not be one "first" flag, but many.

The Marine Committee of the Second Continental Congress passed a Flag Resolution on June 14, 1777, establishing the first congressional description of official United States ensigns. The shape and arrangement of the stars is not mentioned – there were variations – but the legal description legitimized the Ross flag and similar designs:

Resolved, That the flag of the thirteen United States be thirteen stripes, alternate red and white; that the union be thirteen stars, white in a blue field, representing a new constellation.

As late as 1779, the War Board of the Continental Congress had still not settled on what the Army Standard of the United States should look like. The Board sent a letter to General Washington asking his opinion, and submitting a design that included a serpent, as well as a number corresponding to the state that flew the flag.

Francis Hopkinson is given credit for a number of 13-star arrangements, including the so-called Betsy Ross design that he proposed for a $40 bill and a more likely design of five rows of stars. In a 1780 letter to the Continental Board of Admiralty dealing with the Admiralty seal, Hopkinson mentioned patriotic designs he created in the past few years, including "the Flag of the United States of America." He asked for compensation for his designs, but his claim for full compensation was rejected. Hopkinson was not the only person consulted on designing the Great Seal of the United States. Furthermore, he was a public servant and thus was already on the government's payroll.

George Henry Preble states in his 1882 text that no one knows who designed the 1777 flag, and that no combined stars and stripes flag was in common use prior to June 1777. Historian Laurel Thatcher Ulrich argues that there was no "first flag" worth arguing over. Ross biographer Marla Miller asserts that the question of Betsy Ross's involvement in the flag should not be one of design, but of production and entrepreneurship. Researchers accept that the United States flag evolved, and did not have one design.

Grace Rogers Cooper dates the earliest appearance of the "Ross" design as 1792, but with six-pointed stars. Her research for the Smithsonian Institution found 17 examples of 13-star flags that were in existence between 1779 and ca. 1796. Marla Miller writes, "The flag, like the Revolution it represents, was the work of many hands."

== Symbolism ==
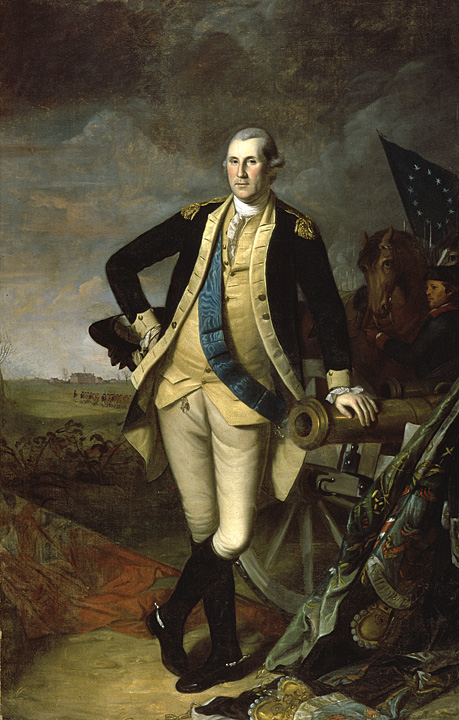
The 1779 portrait Washington at Princeton shows a blue battle flag with a circle of thirteen six-point white stars.

A Betsy Ross flag with six-point white stars as depicted in Washington at Princeton.

Because the flag evolved during the American Revolutionary War, the meaning of the design is uncertain. Historians and experts discredit the common theory that the stripes and five-pointed stars derived from the Washington family coat of arms. While this theory adds to Washington's legendary involvement in the development of the first flag, no evidence exists to show a connection between his coat of arms and the flag, other than that his coat of arms has stars and stripes in it. Washington frequently used his family coat of arms with three five-pointed red stars and three red-and-white stripes, on which is based the flag of the District of Columbia.

=== Stripes ===
During the Revolutionary War era and into the 19th century, the "Rebellious Stripes" were considered as the most important element of United States flags, and were almost always mentioned before the stars. The usage of stripes in the flag may be linked to two pre-existing flags. A 1765 Sons of Liberty flag flown in Boston had nine red and white stripes, and these "rebellious stripes" would influence later designs leading up to the American Revolution. A flag used by Captain Abraham Markoe's Philadelphia Light Horse Troop in 1775 had 13 blue and silver stripes. One or both of these flags likely influenced the design of the American flag.

=== Stars ===
The canton, featuring the stars, may have gradually replaced the British Union flag as hope for reconciliation faded. Regimental flags featuring stars in a blue canton, such as those of the Green Mountain Boys or 1st Rhode Island Regiment, may have pre-dated the 1777 Flag Resolution. Stars were important symbols in European heraldry, their meaning differing with the shape and number of points. Stars appear in colonial flags as early as 1676. (Note: Portsmouth and Providence both featured flags with stars by 1680.) Some have speculated that stars may be linked to Freemasonry, but stars of this type were not an important icon in Freemasonry. Although early American flags featured stars with various numbers of points, the five-pointed star is a defining feature of the Betsy Ross legend. The five-pointed star became the norm on Navy ensigns, perhaps because five-pointed stars were more clearly defined from a distance.

=== Circle ===
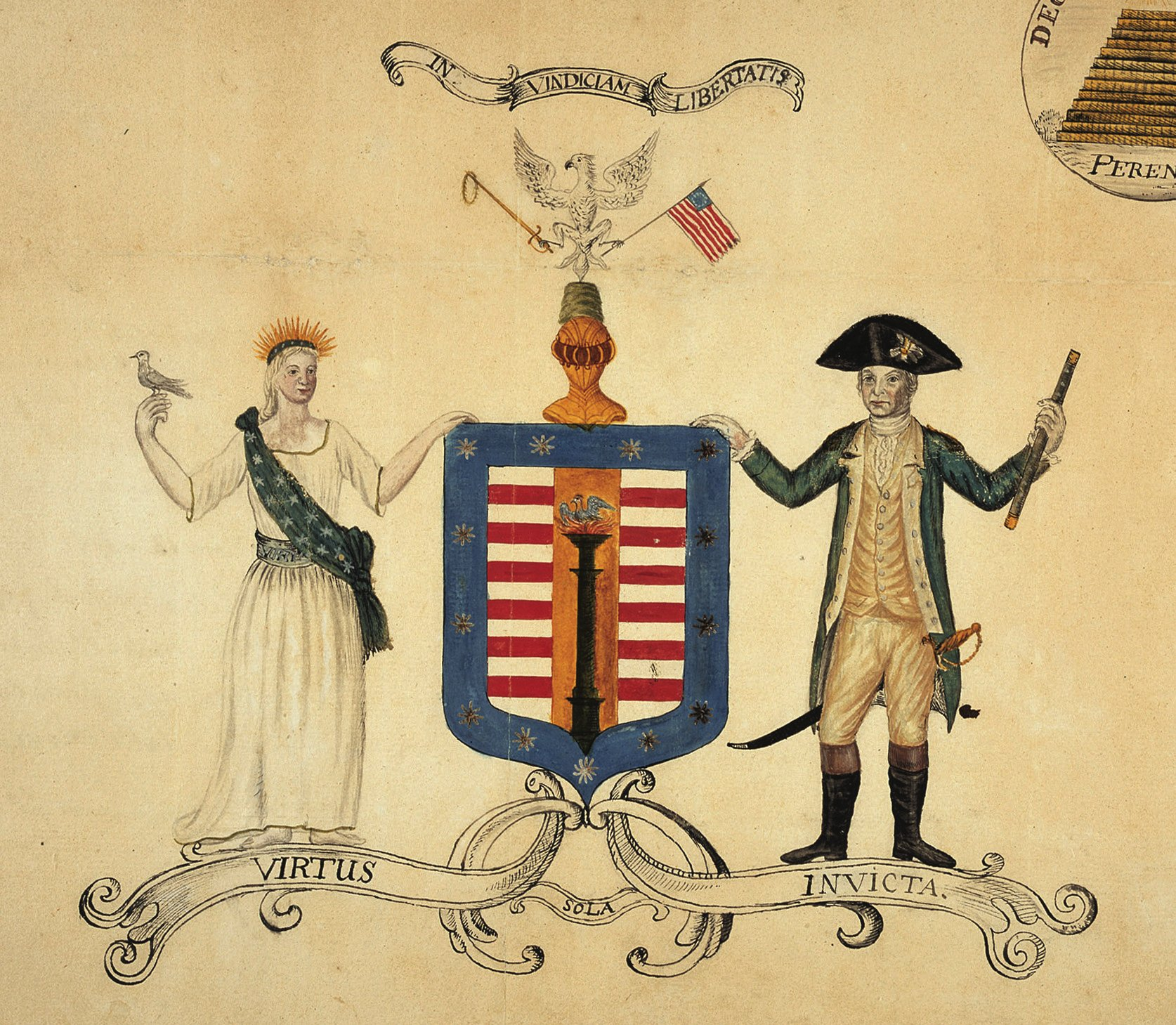
A 1782 Great Seal of the United States design features a flag with a circle of stars in the canton and white stripes on the edges.

The shape and arrangement of the stars varied widely throughout the 18th and 19th centuries, and remains undefined by the various flag acts. In the late 18th century, a circle of stars, also known as a "wreath" or "medallion" arrangement, was a favorite for painters and coin designers, as well as some flag makers. The circle generally represented unity between the states, with no state more dominant than any other. Circular arrangements similar to the "Betsy Ross" design were seen as early as 1777 at the surrender of General John Burgoyne at Saratoga. Eyewitness Alfred Street wrote:

The stars were disposed in a circle, symbolizing the perpetuity of the Union; the ring, like the circling serpent of the Egyptians, signifying eternity. The thirteen stripes showed with the stars the number of the United Colonies, and denoted the subordination of the States to the Union, as well as equality among themselves." (Note: George Henry Preble's 1880 edition of his History of the American Flag finds Alfred Street's "poetic and fanciful" account to be unsubstantiated by any contemporaneous proof.)

A flag with a circle of stars was again found in 1782, in William Barton's 2nd design for the Great Seal of the United States. Barton described the circle as a "symbol of eternity." Ironically, although the circle of stars is a feature of the "Betsy Ross" design, none of Betsy Ross's family documents mention this arrangement. Circumstantial evidence from the Betsy Ross House suggests that Betsy Ross may have arranged her stars in rows.

Several U.S. flags after the Betsy Ross flag use a circle of stars in their designs. This includes the Cowpens flag, the Bennington flag, the flag of the U.S. (1861–1863), the flag of the U.S. (1863–1865), the wagon wheel U.S. flag, the Medallion Centennial U.S. flag, and the flag of the U.S. (1877–1890).

=== Colors ===
Early US flags used a wide variety of colors, and there is no known documented meaning behind the colors of the flag until Charles Thomson, in his 1782 report to Congress on the Great Seal of the United States, wrote "The colours of the pales are those used in the flag of the United States of America. White signifies purity and innocence. Red hardiness and valour and Blue the colour of the Chief signifies vigilance perseverance and justice." The use of red and blue in flags at this time in history may derive from the relative fastness of the dyes indigo and cochineal, providing blue and red colors respectively, as aniline dyes were unknown. However, the most simple explanation for the colors of the American flag is that it was modeled after British flags. For example, the Continental Union Flag, a predecessor to early stars and stripes designs, was likely based on the King's Colours or East India Company flag.

== Political and cultural significance ==
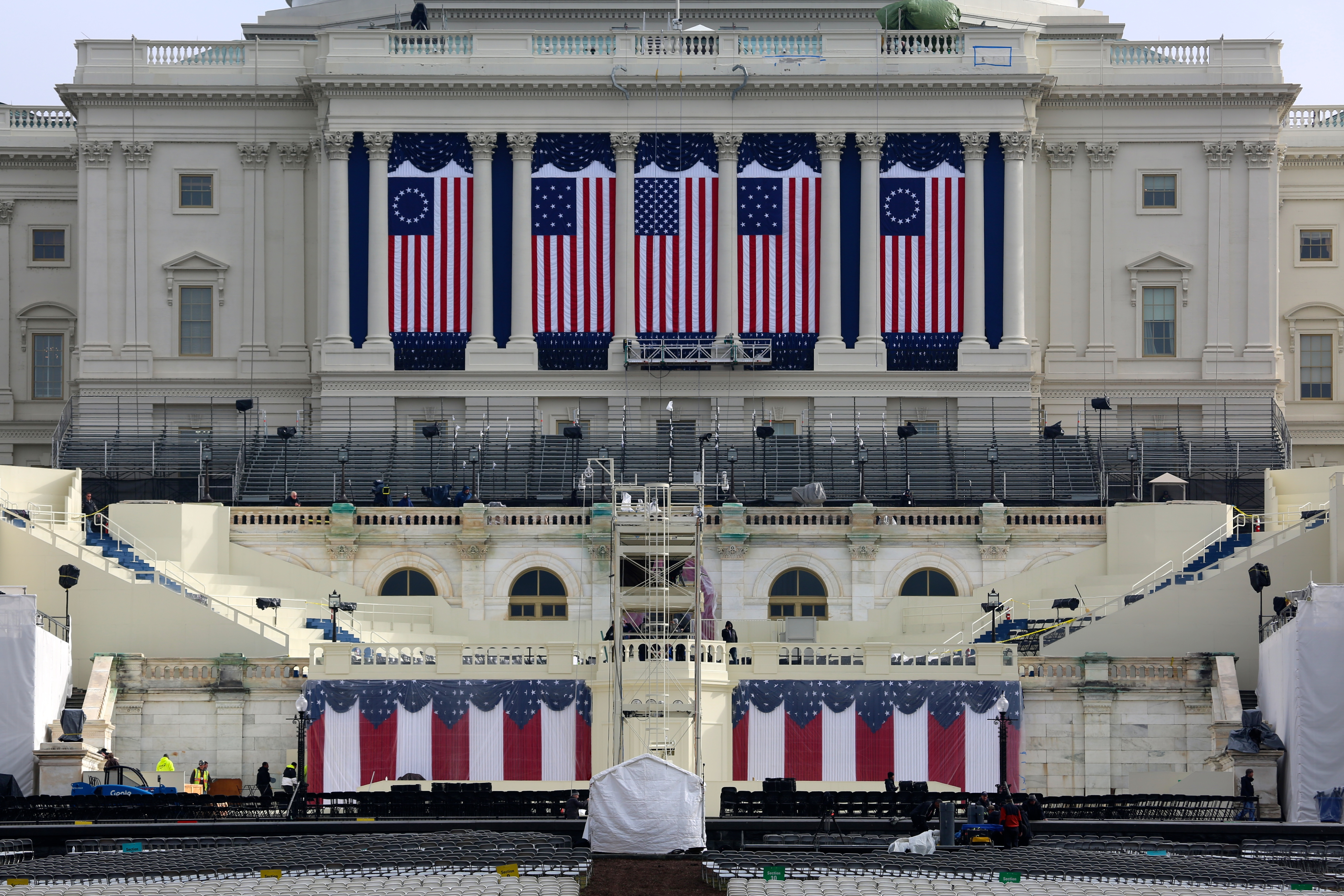
The "Betsy Ross" design is traditionally displayed at US presidential inaugurations. As seen in Trump's first inauguration, it was flown next to another U.S 13-star flag, but in Hopkinson's layout.

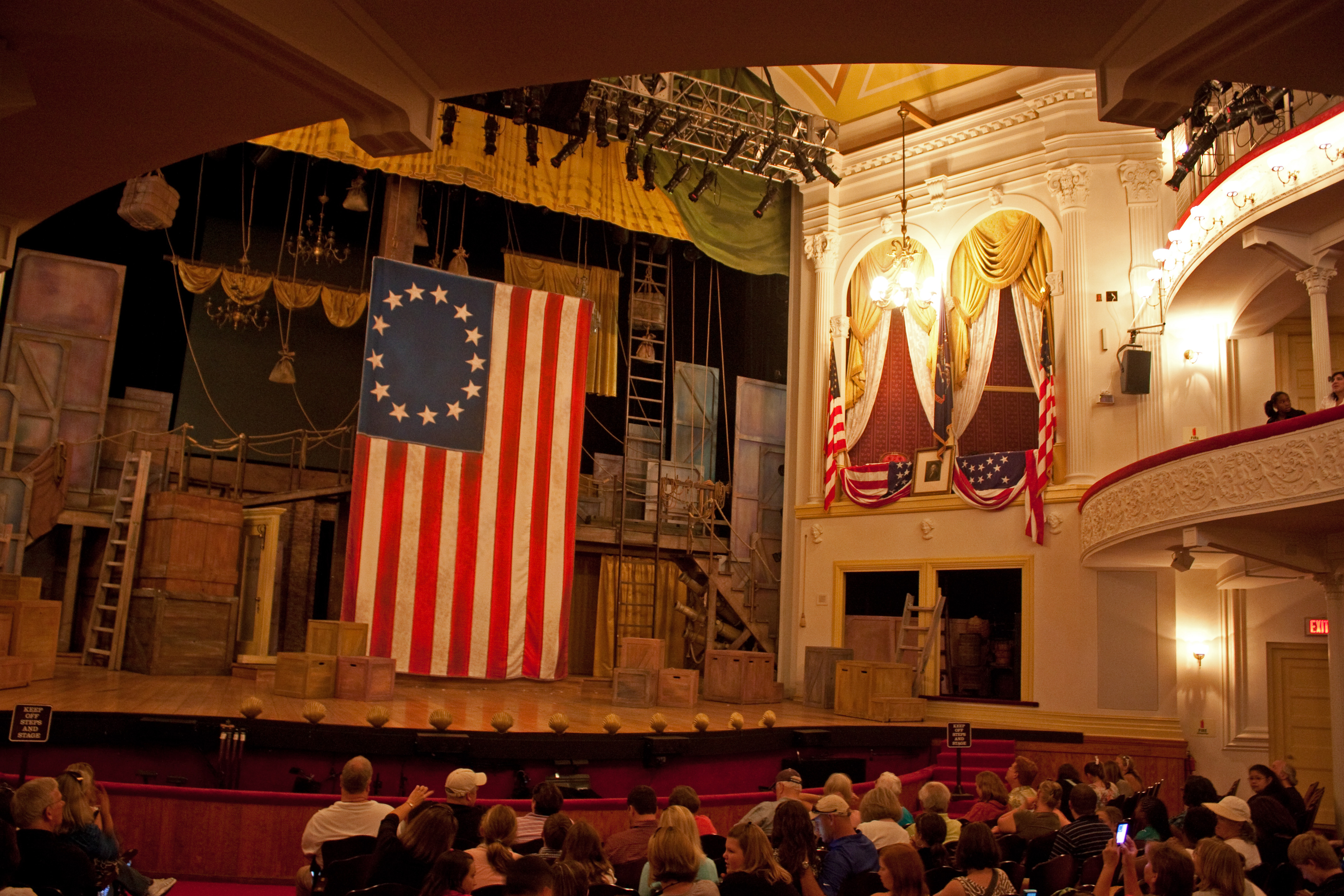
The Betsy Ross flag inside Ford's Theatre in Washington, D.C.

The Betsy Ross design, with its easily identifiable circle of stars, has long been regarded as a symbol of the American Revolution and the young Republic. William J. Canby's recounting of the event appealed to Americans eager for stories about the revolution and its heroines. Betsy Ross was promoted as a patriotic role model for young girls and a symbol of women's contributions to American history.

The Betsy Ross flag design is featured prominently in a number of post-Revolutionary paintings about the war, such as General George Washington at Trenton (1792) (Note: Grace Rogers Cooper writes "In 1792, Trumbull painted thirteen stars in a circle in his General George Washington at Trenton in the Yale University Art Gallery. In his unfinished rendition of the Surrender of Cornwallis at Yorktown, date not established, the circle of stars is suggested and one star shows six points while the thirteen stripes are of red, white, and blue. How accurately the artist depicted the star design that he saw is not known. At times, he may have offered a poetic version of the flag he was interpreting which was later copied by the flag maker. The flag sheets and the artists do not agree.{...} Star arrangement Number of star points Colors of stripe Earliest usage {...} (13 stars in a circle) not visible red, white 1792) and Washington Crossing the Delaware (1851). During the United States centennial, not long after the presentation by William Canby, the Betsy Ross design became a highly produced and popular flag.

The traditional backdrop at quadrennial United States presidential inaugurations uses a large Betsy Ross flag and the modern US flag to represent the history of the nation. Since the 1980s, this display also includes a US flag design symbolizing the year the president's home state was admitted to the union. During the inaugurations of Donald Trump in 2017 and Joe Biden, the Betsy Ross flag was placed next to another 13-star Hopkinson flag design to represent the states of New York and Delaware, respectively.

The circle of 13 stars, which defines the Betsy Ross design, is found on four state flags: the flag of Rhode Island, the flag of Georgia, the flag of Indiana, and the flag of Ohio. The flags of New Hampshire and Missouri feature a similar circle of 9 and 24 stars, respectively, signifying their order of admittance to the country. The flag of Mississippi also features a similar circular arc of 20 stars, excluding the gold star, as it was admitted as the 20th state. The United States Foreign Service flag also features the circle of 13-stars.

Since 1963, the Philadelphia 76ers have used the distinctive ring of 13 five-pointed stars in their team logo, as a reference to Philadelphia as the first United States capital, where the Declaration of Independence was signed and where Betsy Ross worked.

Although not a symbol of hate and considered "innocuous" by experts including the Anti-Defamation League, the flag has occasionally been co-opted by far right groups such as the Three Percenters and the Patriot Front. Along with other symbols of the Revolutionary War, the flag was used by some of the participants in the January 6 United States Capitol attack.

U.S. postage stamps featuring the Betsy Ross flag design
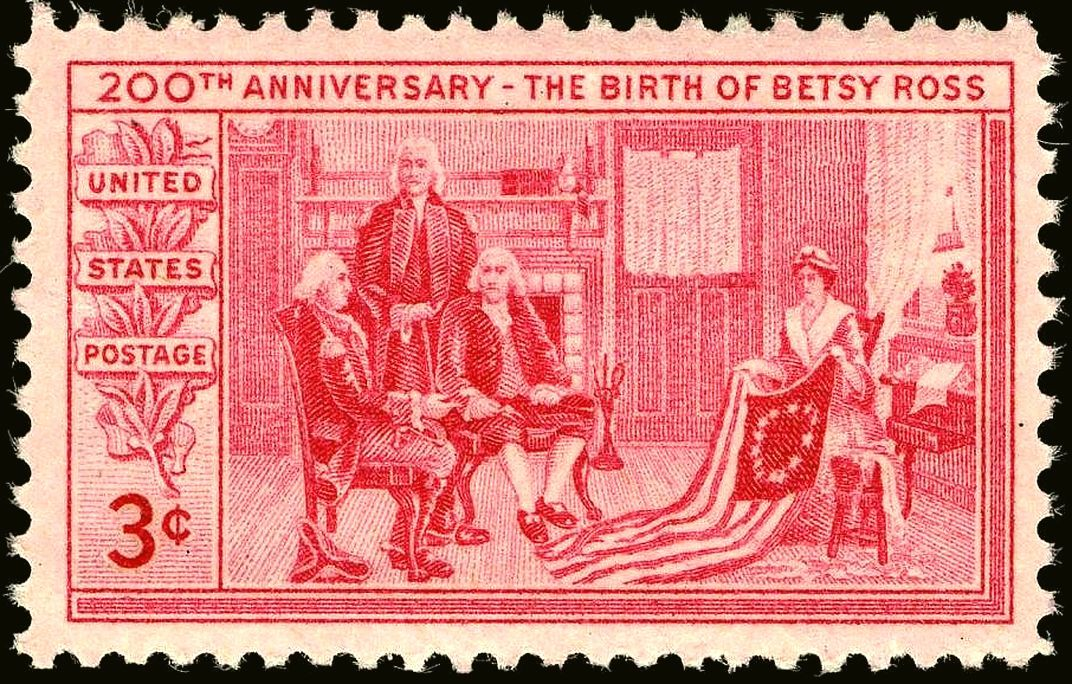
3¢ stamp issued in 1952 to commemorate Betsy Ross' 200th birthday.

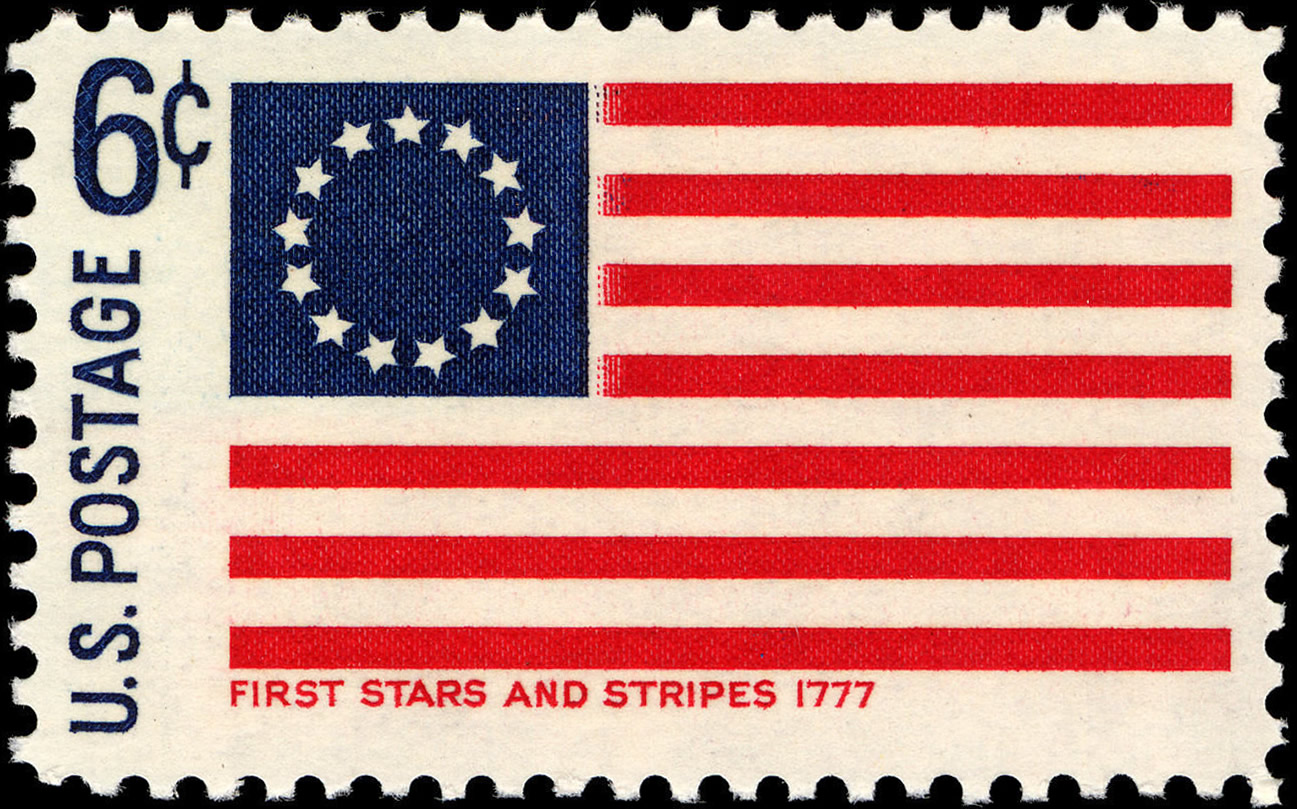
A 6¢ stamp with the Betsy Ross design was released in 1968 as part of the "Historic Flag" series.

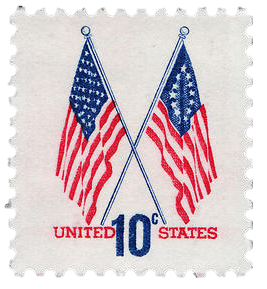
10¢ stamp released in 1973, showing a 50-star flag and a Betsy Ross flag together, to commemorate the United States Bicentennial.

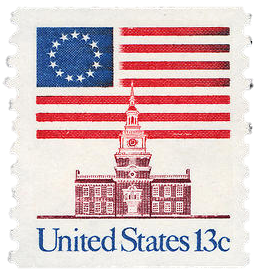
1975 13¢ stamp features the Betsy Ross flag behind Independence Hall

== Bibliography ==
- Cooper, Grace Rogers (1973). Thirteen-Star Flags (PDF). Washington, D.C.: Smithsonian Institution Press.
- Furlong, William; McCandless, Byron (1981). So Proudly We Hail. The History of the United States Flag. Washington, DC: Smithsonian Institution Press. ISBN 0-87474-448-2.
- Kiem, Kevin; Kiel, Peter (2007). A Grand Old Flag: A History of the United States Through its Flags. New York City: DK Publishing. ISBN 978-0-7566-2847-5.
- Leepson, Marc (2004). Flag: An American Biography. St. Martin's Griffin. ISBN 0-312-32308-5.
- Mastai, Boleslaw; Mastai, Marie-Louise D'Otrange (1973). The Stars and the Stripes. The American Flag as Art and as History from the Birth of the Republic to the Present'. New York: Alfred A. Knopf. ISBN 0-394-47217-9.
- Miller, Marla R. (2010). Betsy Ross and the Making of America. New York: Henry Holt and Company, LLC. ISBN 978-0-8050-8297-5.
- Preble, George Henry (1882). History of the Flag of the United States of America (3rd ed.). Boston: James R. Osgood and Company.
- Vile, John R (2018). The American flag: an encyclopedia of the Stars and Stripes in U.S. history, culture, and law. Santa Barbara, CA: ABC-CLIO. ISBN 978-1-4408-5788-1. LCCN 2018010859.
- Williams, Earl P. Jr. (Spring 1988). "The 'Fancy Work' of Francis Hopkinson: Did He Design the Stars and Stripes?". Prologue (Quarterly of the National Archives). 20 (1): 42–52.
- Znamierowski, Alfred (2002). The World Encyclopedia of Flags. Anness Publishing Limited. ISBN 1-84309-042-2.
