= Cowpens flag =

Early version of the United States flag

Cowpens Flag
- Use: Small vexillological symbol or pictogram in black and white showing the different uses of the flag
- Adopted: 1777
- Design: Thirteen alternating red and white stripes, a blue canton with twelve five-pointed stars arranged in a circle with a star in the center
- Use: Small vexillological symbol or pictogram in black and white showing the different uses of the flag
- Adopted: 1777
- Design: Thirteen alternating red and white stripes, a blue canton with twelve five-pointed stars arranged in an oval with a star in the center

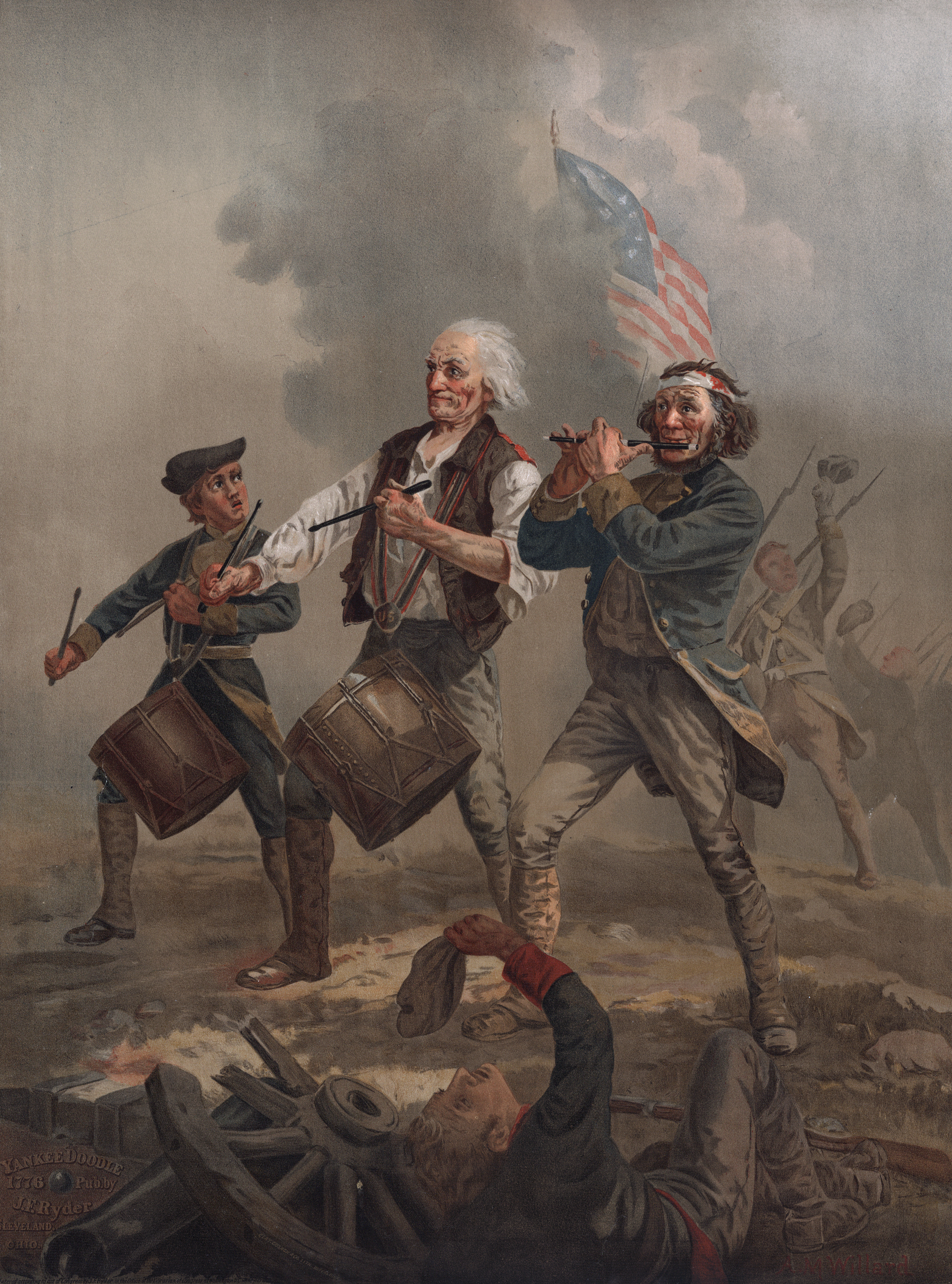
The famous Spirit of '76 painting by Archibald MacNeal Willard features the Cowpens flag (not the Betsy Ross design, which is similar).

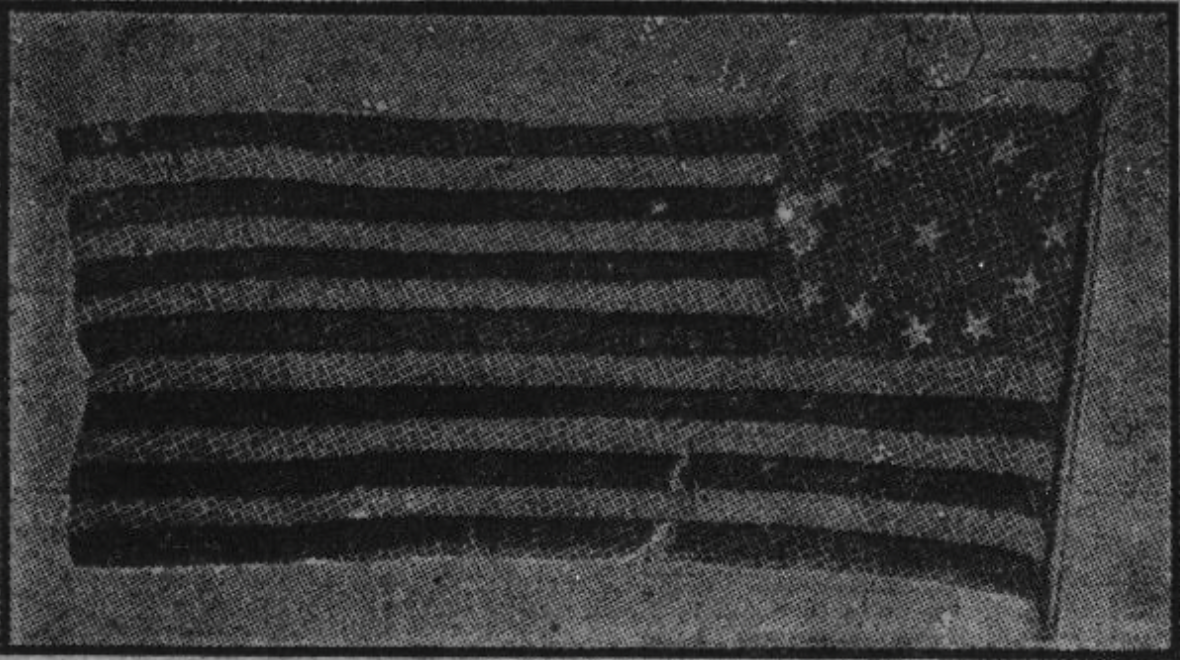
Original flag

The Cowpens flag, or 3rd Maryland flag, is an early version of the United States flag that meets the congressional requirements of the Flag Resolution of 1777. Like the Betsy Ross flag, the white stars are arranged in a ring on a blue field; but the ring consists of just 12 stars, with the 13th star in the center. There are two interpretations of the ring, most reproductions arrange the ring of stars in a circular pattern, while the physical 19th-century Batchelor artifact preserved in the Maryland State Archives places the ring of stars in a horizontally elongated oval pattern.

== Description ==
This version of the US flag was said to have been carried by William Batchelor of the 3rd Maryland Regiment at the Battle of Cowpens, January 17, 1781, and this arrangement of stars has come to be known as the "3rd Maryland design." The Batchelor family donated their original flag, known as the Batchelor Flag, to the 'Society of the War of 1812' in 1894. After William N. Batchelor challenged the authenticity of the flag, however, the Baltimore Society of the War of 1812 appointed J. Appleton Wilson to research the history. Wilson determined that the flag was actually carried by Joshua F. Batchelor at the Battle of North Point during the War of 1812, where it acquired its many bullet holes. The society had later used the flag to mark the anniversary of the Battle of North Point, but had also used the flag for ceremonies regarding the American Revolution, including a parade for Lafayette when he visited Maryland in 1824.

The Batchelor Flag was on display in the Maryland Statehouse flag room until the 1980s, when older flags were moved to storage for preservation. It is currently held at the Maryland Archives. A 1970s study conducted by the Maryland State Archivist and the Smithsonian Institution, however, concluded that the preserved flag was of 19th-century origin. Among the reasons for this conclusion are:

- The 3rd Maryland Regiment was not at the Battle of Cowpens.
- No American regiment was officially authorized to carry Stars and Stripes flags.
- The first Stars and Stripes flag constructed in Maryland was made in 1782, at least a year after the Battle of Cowpens.
- The fabric and construction technique match other 19th century flags.

A Smithsonian publication acknowledges that the Cowpens design may date to the American Revolution, but the actual flag held at Maryland dates no earlier than 1843.

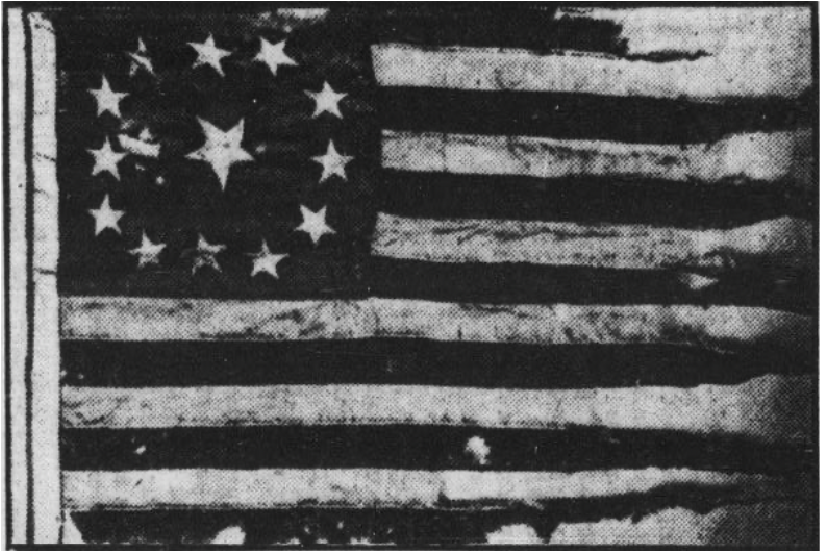
Flag of the USS Constitution

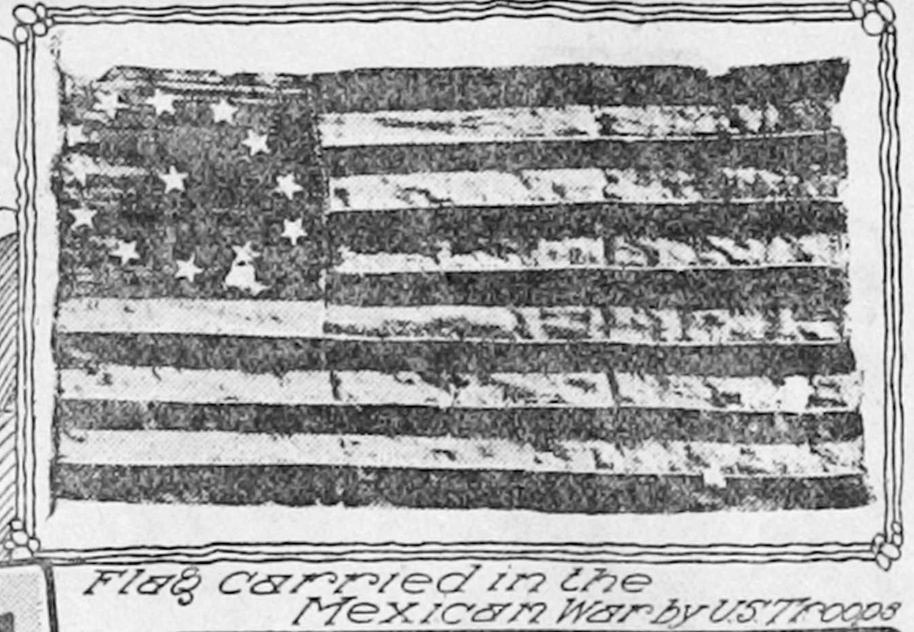
Flag carried by Battalion of Maryland and District of Columbia Volunteers during the Mexican-American War

The flag of Easton, Pennsylvania reverses the 3rd Maryland design, with the star wreath on the field of the flag, and the 13 red and white stripes in the canton.

The star pattern was popular enough to see continued use in 15-star flags as the nation began to grow. A surviving military commission signed by Thomas Jefferson in 1808 shows a 15-star flag and a 15-star Navy jack, both using the 3rd Maryland star arrangement (14 star circle with the 15th star in the center).

One of the American flags flown by the USS Constitution had the same pattern.

During the Mexican-American War the Battalion of Maryland and District of Columbia Volunteers carried a flag very similar in design.

The crest of the Navy cruiser USS Cowpens (CG-63) features the 3rd Maryland star pattern in the foreground, as well as two Cowpens flags in the background.

== Sources ==
- Cooper, Grace Rogers (1973). Thirteen Star Flags. Smithsonian Institution Press.جعفر Available online (21.7 MB).
- Furlong, William Rea; McCandless, Byron (1981). So Proudly We Hail : The History of the United States Flag. Washington, D.C.: Smithsonian Institution Press. ISBN 0-87474-448-2.
- Leepson, Marc (2004). Flag: An American Biography. ISBN 0-312-32308-5
- Mastai, Boleslaw and Marie-Louise D'Otrange (1973). The Stars and the Stripes: The American Flag as Art and as History from the Birth of the Republic to the Present. Alfred A. Knopf, New York. ISBN 0-394-47217-9
