= Battle of Cooch's Bridge =

1777 battle of the American Revolutionary War

- Part of the American Revolutionary War
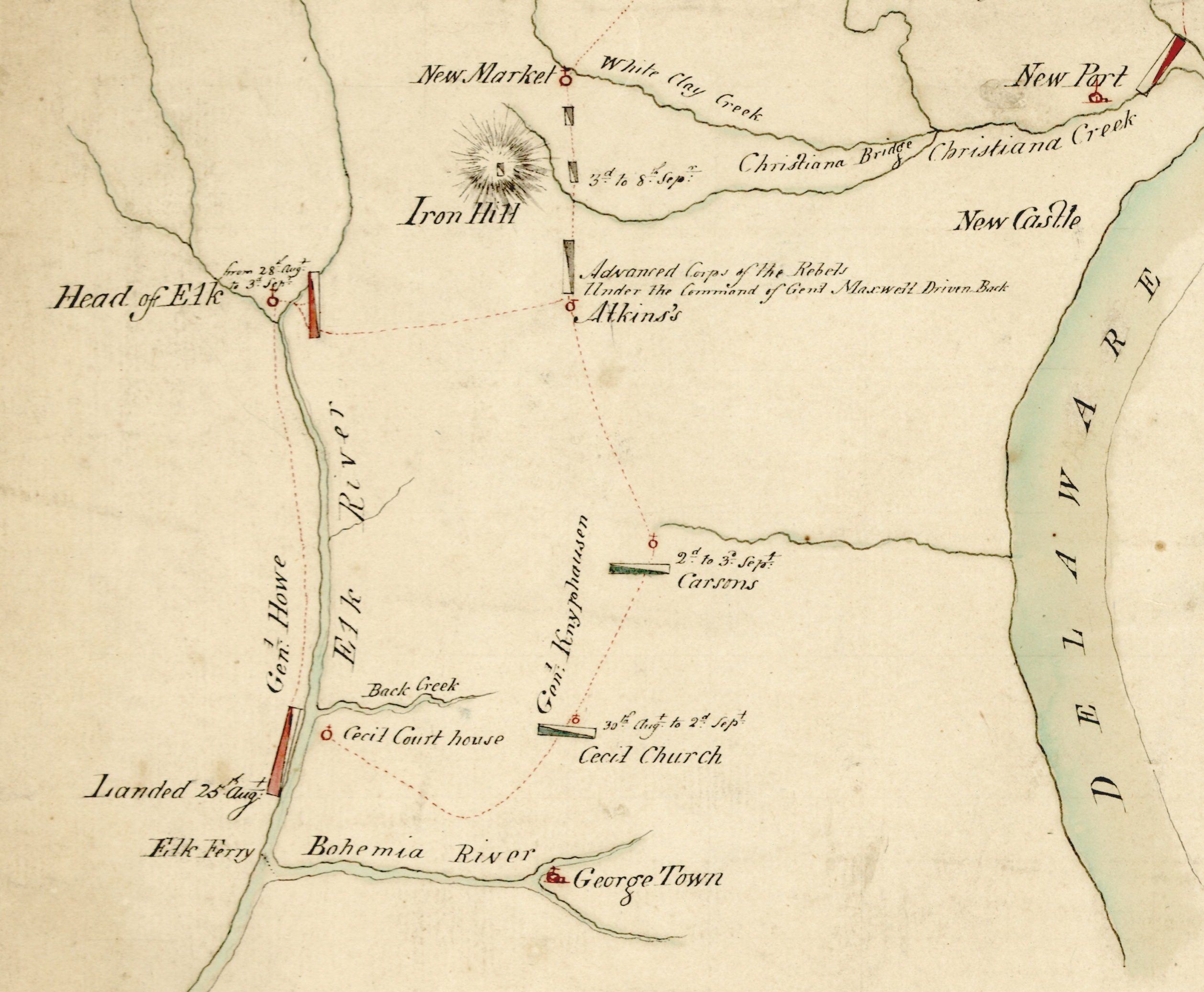
- Detail of a 1777 military map. Cooch's Bridge is just to the right of Iron Hill; Philadelphia is off to the northeast.
Date	September 3, 1777
Location	Newark, Delaware 39°38′23″N 75°43′36″W
Result	British victory

Belligerents
United States	Great Britain; Hesse; Ansbach

Commanders and leaders
(United States) William Maxwell	(Kingdom of Great Britain) Sir William Howe; Ludwig Wurmb

Strength
1,000	450 jägers 1,300 British light infantry

Casualties and losses
20 killed 20 wounded	23 to 30 killed or wounded

The Battle of Cooch's Bridge, also known as the Battle of Iron Hill, was fought on September 3, 1777, between the Continental Army and American militia and primarily German soldiers serving alongside the British Army during the American Revolutionary War. It was the only significant military action during the war on the soil of Delaware (though there were also naval engagements off the state's coast), and it took place about a week before the major Battle of Brandywine. Some traditions claim this as the first battle which saw the U.S. flag.

After landing in Maryland on August 25 as part of a campaign to capture Philadelphia, the seat of the Continental Congress, British and German forces under the overall command of General William Howe began to move north. Their advance was monitored by a light infantry corps of Continental Army and militia forces that had based itself at Cooch's Bridge, near Newark, Delaware. On September 3, German troops leading the British advance were met by musket fire from the U.S. light infantry in the woods on either side of the road leading toward Cooch's Bridge. Calling up reinforcements, they flushed the Americans out and drove them across the bridge.

== Background ==
After having successfully captured New York City in 1776, British military planners organized two expeditions to divide the Thirteen Colonies and, they hoped, decisively end the rebellion. One expedition was to take control of the Hudson River by a descent from Quebec, while the other was targeted at the colonial capital, Philadelphia. In pursuit of the latter objective, Lieutenant General William Howe embarked an army numbering about 18,000 (plus about 5,000 camp followers) onto transports in late July 1777, and sailed from New York City to the Chesapeake Bay. The Continental Army of Major General George Washington remained near New York until Howe's objective became clear. Howe's plan was gauged to the south, intending to move against Philadelphia via the Chesapeake. Washington marched his army, numbering about 16,000, through Philadelphia, and established a camp at Wilmington, Delaware. Riding further south and west to perform reconnaissance on August 26, Washington learned that the British had landed.

On August 25, Howe's army disembarked below a small town called Head of Elk (now known as Elkton, and located at the head of navigation of the Elk River) in Maryland, about 50 miles (80 km) south of Philadelphia. Due to the relatively poor quality of the landing area, his troops moved immediately to the north, reaching Head of Elk itself on August 28. Advance troops consisting of British light infantry and German Jäger moved east across Elk Creek and occupied Gray's Hill, about one mile (1.6 km) west of Iron Hill, near Cooch's Bridge, which was a few miles south of Newark. The bridge was named for Thomas Cooch, a local landowner whose house was near the bridge.

Washington would normally have assigned the duties of advance guard to Daniel Morgan and his riflemen, but he had detached these to assist Horatio Gates in the defense of the Hudson River Valley against the advance of General John Burgoyne. Since they were unavailable, he organized a light infantry corps consisting of 700 picked men from Continental Army regiments (including future Supreme Court Chief Justice John Marshall, who would go on to fight in the coming battle) and about 1,000 Pennsylvania and Delaware militia, and placed them under the command of Brigadier General William Maxwell. These troops occupied Iron Hill and Cooch's Bridge. General Nathanael Greene advocated moving the entire Continental Army to this position, believing the Christina River to be a more defensible point, but Washington declined, instead ordering Maxwell to monitor British movements and slow its advance while the rest of the army fortified the Red Clay Creek and Wilmington. Maxwell's men were encamped on either side of the road leading south from Cooch's Bridge toward Aiken's Tavern (present-day Glasgow, Delaware) in a series of small camps designed to facilitate ambushes. On August 28, Washington, atop Iron Hill, and Howe, on Gray's Hill, observed each other as they took stock of the enemy's position; one of the Hessian generals wrote, "These gentlemen observed us with their glasses as carefully as we observed them. Those of our officers who know Washington well, maintained that the man in the plain coat was Washington."

On September 2, Howe's right wing, under the command of the Hessian general, Wilhelm von Knyphausen, left Cecil County Court House and headed north, hampered by rain, bad roads, and poor health of a portion of his soldiers. Early the next morning, Howe's left wing, headed by troops under the command of Charles Cornwallis, left Head of Elk, expecting to join with Knyphausen's division at Aiken's Tavern, about 5 miles (8.0 km) east. Cornwallis reached the tavern first, and Howe, traveling with Cornwallis, decided to press on to the north without waiting for Knyphausen.

== Battle ==
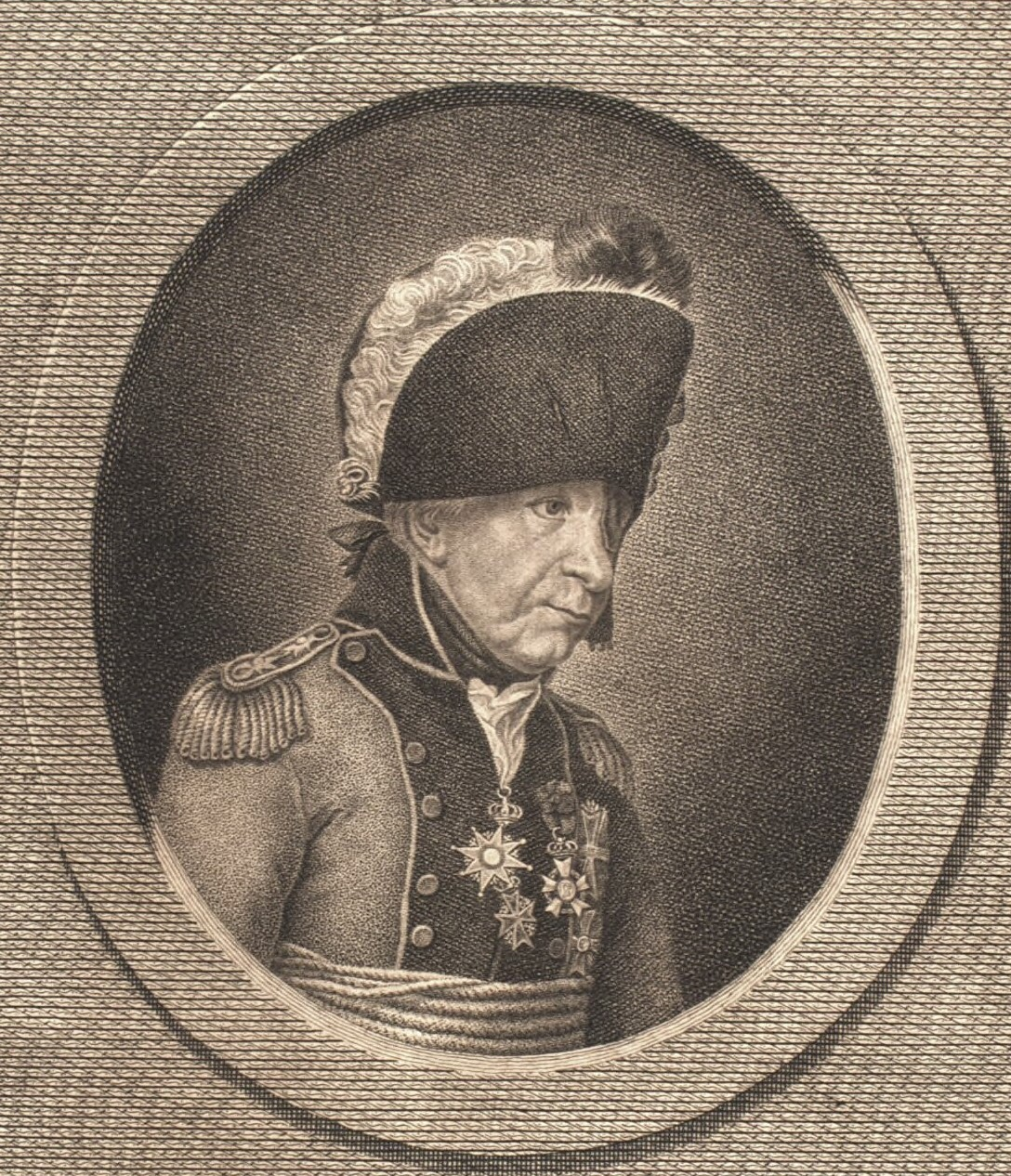
Captain Johann Ewald, later in life

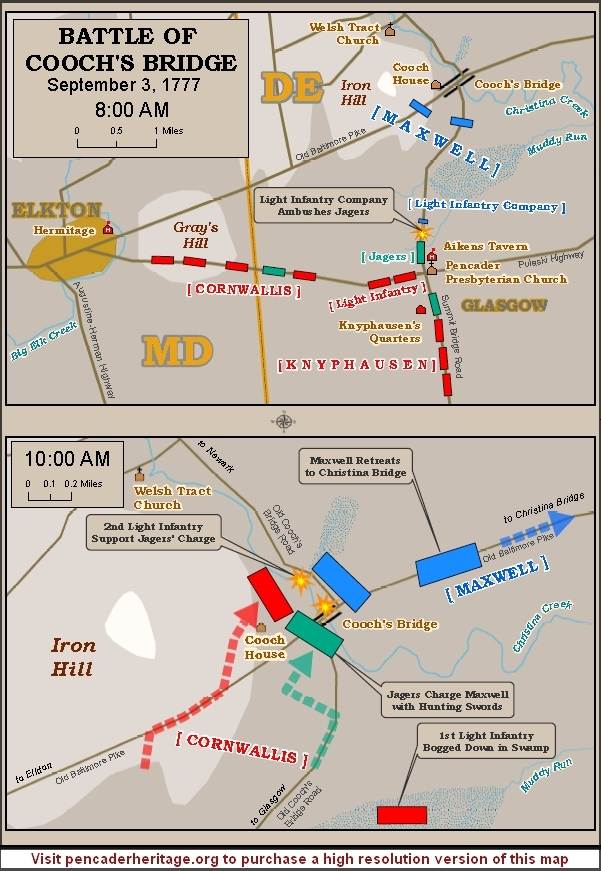
This map was created by Sean Moir for the Pencader Heritage Area Museum in Newark, DE

A small company of Hessian dragoons led by Captain Johann Ewald headed up the road from the tavern toward Cooch's Bridge as Cornwallis's advance guard. These were struck by a volley of fire from an American ambush and many of them fell, either killed or wounded. Ewald remained unwounded, and quickly alerted the Hessian and Ansbach Jäger, who rushed forward to meet the Americans. This began a running skirmish that Major John André described as follows: "Here the rebels began to attack us about 9 o'clock with a continued irregular fire for nearly two miles." Howe rode to the front lines, and seeing Iron Hill crawling with enemy soldiers, ordered his troops to clear it. At this time, much of Maxwell's force was defending Iron Hill, while the rest were protecting Cooch's Bridge. The Jäger, numbering over 400 men led by Lieutenant Colonel Ludwig von Wurmb, formed a line and, with the support of some artillery, advanced on the Americans. Von Wurmb sent one detachment to Maxwell's left, hoping to flank his position, and supported the move with a bayonet charge against the American center.

The battle lasted for much of the day; at Cooch's Bridge, Maxwell's men made a stand until they "had shot themselves out of ammunition" and "the fight was carried on with the sword" and bayonet (the latter being a weapon Maxwell's militia lacked experience in using). After seven hours of fighting, the Americans were forced to retreat from Iron Hill across Cooch's Bridge, taking up a position on the far side. Howe ordered the 1st and 2nd British Light Infantry Battalion to assist the Jäger in taking the bridge. While the 1st Battalion under Robert Abercromby became mired in swampy terrain attempting to ford the Christina River, the 2nd Battalion reached the right of the Jäger and the bridge was taken. Maxwell's army then retreated back toward Wilmington.

Casualty reports for the British range from 3 killed and 20 wounded to about 30 killed or wounded. One British deserter reported that nine wagonloads of wounded were sent toward the fleet. The Americans claimed 20 killed and another 20 wounded, and Washington in a letter to Congress said the losses were "not very considerable"; however, the British reported burying 41 Americans, and Howe's official report claimed "not less than fifty killed and many more wounded". General Maxwell was criticized for his leadership by a number of Washington's subordinates. One foreign officer with service in the Army of Prussia commented to Henry Laurens in reference to Maxwell, "Your soldiers are very good men, so good as any brave men in the world, but your officers my dear colonel, your officers..."

== Aftermath ==
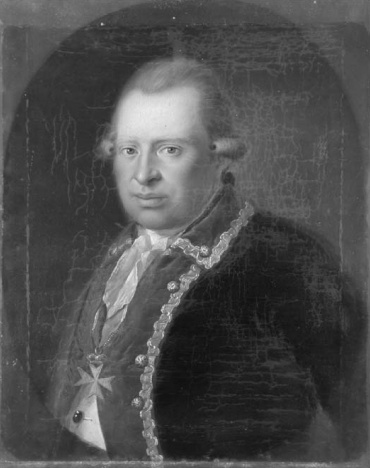
Lt. Col. Ludwig von Wurmb, portrait c. 1788

General Cornwallis occupied the house of Thomas Cooch, and Howe's forces remained at Iron Hill for five days. In a letter to Congress, Washington justified the defeat by saying, "This Morning the Enemy came out with considerable force and three pieces of Artillery, against our Light advanced Corps, and after some pretty smart skirmishing obliged them to retreat, being far inferior in number and without Cannon." Certain that Howe would advance along the main road toward Wilmington in his bid to capture Philadelphia, Washington continued to fortify the city and the Red Clay Creek. He moved his headquarters from Wilmington to Newport, and the army formed defenses between Newport and Marshallton. While Howe's army remained in place, the two forces engaged in small skirmishes over the next few days. One officer under Howe noted that the rebel patrols, which usually consist of 10 to 15 dragoons and 20 to 30 infantrymen, now appear more often, and they fire at our posts occasionally."

Sensing an attack coming, Washington told his troops on September 5th, "Should they [the British] push their design against Philadelphia, on this route, their all is at stake—they will put the contest on the event of a single battle: If they are overthrown, they are utterly undone—the war is at an end." Two days later, upon hearing that British ships had left the Chesapeake, Washington was sure Howe's move was imminent. He rallied his troops, referencing Horatio Gates's successes against the British in the north, saying "Who can forbear to emulate their [Gates's army] noble spirit? Who is there without ambition, to share with them, the applauses of their countrymen, and of all posterity, as the defenders of Liberty, and the procurers of peace and happiness to millions in the present and future generations? Two years we have maintained the war and struggled with difficulties innumerable. But the prospect has since brightened, and our affairs put on a better face—Now is the time to reap the fruits of all our toils and dangers! ... The eyes of all America, and of Europe are turned upon us."

But the attack never came. Instead, on September 8, Howe moved his force north, through Newark and Hockessin into Pennsylvania. Upon realizing what the British were doing late in the night, Washington rushed his forces north as well to find a new defensive position. He settled on Chadds Ford, just across the Delaware border, upon the Brandywine River—the last natural defense before the Schuylkill River and Philadelphia. It was there that the two armies clashed again in the major Battle of Brandywine on September 11. The British victory in that battle paved the way for their eventual entry into and occupation of the city of Philadelphia.

This success was more than offset by the failure of the expedition to the Hudson, in which General Burgoyne surrendered his army after the Battles of Saratoga, in October. News of Burgoyne's surrender greatly changed the war, because it (and the Battle of Germantown, fought after the British occupied Philadelphia) was a major factor in France's decision to enter the war as an American ally in 1778.

== Legacy ==
The site of the battle has been preserved as the Cooch's Bridge Historic District, and is listed on the National Register of Historic Places. In 2003, the Cooch family sold the state some land as well as development rights for an additional 200 acres (81 ha) of land in the area of the battlefield. They also established a $1.5 million fund to restore and maintain the property, and granted the state a right of first refusal to purchase the Thomas Cooch house, which remained with the family.

In 2007, the 230th anniversary of the battle was commemorated by a re-enactment event hosted by members of the recreated 2nd Virginia Regiment.

The Battle of Cooch's Bridge is memorialized on the coat of arms for Glasgow High School which is built on part of the battlefield. It shows Continental soldiers fighting British Army soldiers while flying the "Betsy Ross flag". In 2010, the Christina School District All-District Honor Band performed a selection written and named for the event: "The Battle of Cooch's Bridge March"

In late 2018, the state of Delaware announced its intention to purchase the house at the center of the battlefield site, as well as some of the surrounding land, from the Cooch family. The purchase, of which $875,000 was funded by the state and $225,000 from private philanthropic trusts, was intended to allow the site to be used to educate the public about the battle. The state government also proposed to allow archaeologists to excavate the site, in the hope of locating unmarked graves of those involved in the conflict. The family pledged to donate twenty percent of the sale to the Cooch's Bridge Historic District Fund, which provides funding the ongoing preservation of the site.

== General and cited references ==
- Boatner, Mark Mayo, Cassell's Biographical Dictionary of the American War of Independence 1763–1783, Cassell, London, 1966, ISBN 0-304-29296-6.
- Buchanan, John (2004). The Road to Valley Forge. Hoboken, NJ: John Wiley. ISBN 978-0-471-44156-4. OCLC 231991487.
- Clement, Justin (2007). Philadelphia 1777: Taking the Capital. Osprey Publishing. ISBN 978-1-84603-033-8.
- Cooch, Mary Evarts Webb (1919). Ancestry and descendants of Nancy Allyn (Foote) Webb, Rev. Edward Webb, and Joseph Wilkins Cooch. Wilmington, DE: Star Publishing. p. 121. OCLC 14558010.
- "Preservation of Cooch's Bridge Battlefield". Delaware Sons of the American Revolution. Archived from the original on June 26, 2010.
- Harris, Michael (2014). Brandywine: A Military History of the Battle That Lost Philadelphia but Saved America, September 11, 1777. Savas Beatie. ISBN 9781611211627. OCLC 870703167.
- Heitman, Francis B. (1965) [1903]. Historical Register and Dictionary of the United States Army, from its Organization, September 29, 1789, to March 2, 1903. Volume 2. Urbana, IL: University of Illinois Press. OCLC 568724.
- Martin, David G (1993). The Philadelphia Campaign: June 1777 – July 1778. Conshohocken, PA: Combined Books. ISBN 0-938289-19-5. 2003 Da Capo reprint, ISBN 0-306-81258-4.
- McGuire, Thomas J (2006). The Philadelphia Campaign, Vol. I: Brandywine and the Fall of Philadelphia. Mechanicsburg, PA: Stackpole Books. ISBN 978-0-8117-0178-5.
- "National Register Information System". National Register of Historic Places. National Park Service. 2009-03-13. Archived from the original on 2015-05-06.
- Reed, John F (1965). Campaign to Valley Forge: July 1, 1777 – December 19, 1777. Philadelphia: University of Pennsylvania Press. OCLC 1344882.
- "The Battle of Cooch's Bridge, Part 1". The Saving Delaware History Podcast. Archived from the original on 2021-04-25.
- Ward, Christopher L., The Delaware Continentals, 1776–1783, The Historical Society of Delaware, Wilmington, DE, 1941, ISBN 0-924117-21-4.
- Ward, Christopher (1952). The War of the Revolution. New York: MacMillan. OCLC 214962727.
