= Ludwig von Wurmb =

General in Hesse-Cassel Army

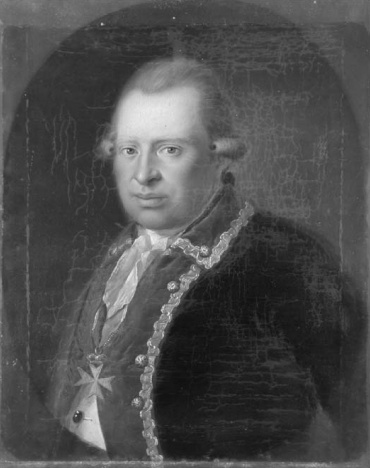
- Portrait of Wurmb, c. 1788
- Born: 10 May 1736
- Died: 5 April 1813 (aged 76)
- Allegiance: Hesse-Kassel (until 1807); Kingdom of Westphalia (1807‍–‍1813)
- Rank: Lieutenant general
- Battles / wars: Seven Years' War; Battle of Bergen; American Revolutionary War; Battle of Cooch's Bridge; War of the First Coalition; Battle of Tourcoing
- Awards: Pour la Vertu Militaire; Order of the Crown of Westphalia

Ludwig von Wurmb (10 May 1736 – 5 April 1813) was a lieutenant general in the army of Hesse-Kassel during the Napoleonic Wars. In the English-speaking world he is probably best known for his service for the British in North America during the War of American Independence, when, as a lieutenant colonel, he commanded the Hessian Jäger corps in campaigns throughout the war. His military service career spanned more than 50 years.

== Life ==
Born into a noble family, he began military service during the Seven Years' War, rising to the rank of captain at age 23. Serving first in the Regiment von Ysenburg, he fought at Hastenbeck, Sandersburg, and Lutterberg before transferring to the Jäger corps. With the Jägers he fought at Bergen and was wounded in an assault on Lübeck in July 1760. Joining the Leib Regiment in 1762, he was captured after his 50-man position at Ullrichstein Castle was assaulted by two French brigades. In 1766 he was promoted major of the Leib Fusiliers, a position he held until his service in North America.

In February 1777 he was given a promotion to lieutenant colonel, backdated to 25 January. In September 1777 he had his first combat on American soil, defeating an advance guard of militiamen in the Battle of Cooch's Bridge. In October of that year he took over command of the entire Jäger corps after its leader, Carl von Donop, was killed in the Battle of Red Bank. His corps performed with distinction in the Battle of Germantown, and guarded the rear of the British move from Philadelphia to New York City in 1778. Wurmb was then involved in the southern campaigns.

In 1782 he was promoted colonel, retroactive to 1778. When the war ended, the Jägers returned to Kassel in 1784. For his performance in North America he was awarded the Hessian Pour la vertu militaire. In 1784 the Jäger corps was disbanded, and Wurmb was assigned to the Regiment von Knyphausen, which he took command of in 1787. The following year he took command of the Leib-Grenadier Regiment, and in 1789 he was named Adjutant General of the Hessian army.

With the outbreak of the War of the First Coalition in 1792, William I, the landgrave provided troops for the coalition, which were led by Wurmb. In early 1794, Wurmb was promoted to major general. In May of that year, his division was in the Battle of Tourcoing, where his Hessians were in the middle of the action. Wurmb was wounded in the leg and carried from the field. After seeing further action in 1795, he returned to Hesse, where he took command of the Leib Infantry Regiment. In 1800, he was promoted to lieutenant general; he also later served on the landgrave's board of war and was governor of Kassel.

In 1805, under threat from Napoleon's armies, the elector again mobilized his forces, concentrating them under Wurmb's command in Kassel. Faced with overwhelming force in 1806, the elector fled, and Napoleon installed his brother Jérome as the new King of Westphalia. Wurmb reluctantly entered the service of the new kingdom, and continued to distinguish himself. Jérome gave him command of the official residence, promoted him to division-general in 1807, and awarded him the Order of the Westphalian Crown in 1810.

Wurmb died in 1813. He never married and had no children. Several of his brothers also rose to high rank in the Hessian military; he was distinguished from them as the "bitter Wurmb".
