= Grace Rogers Cooper =

American museum curator and textile expert

Grace Rogers Cooper (November 22, 1924 – November 25, 2004) was a Smithsonian Institution curator, U.S. textile expert and vexillogist, known primarily for her seminal work Thirteen-Star Flags: Keys to Identification, published in 1973, which exposed a number of "antique" flags as modern replicas.

== Biography ==
Born in Sharon, Pennsylvania, she received her Bachelor of Science degree in 1946 from the University of Maryland, majoring in textiles. After postgraduate work in history and writing, Cooper began a long career with the Smithsonian Institution working with textiles. Cooper served as curator of the division of textiles from 1948 to 1976, and was responsible for many exhibitions on textile history, including the 1964 opening show at the Smithsonian's new Museum of History and Technology (now known as the National Museum of American History).

In addition to Thirteen-Star Flags, Cooper also authored the 1968 work The Invention of the Sewing Machine, which was revised and expanded as The Sewing Machine: Its Invention and Development in 1976. Appendix VII, "A Brief History of Cotton Thread," is of particular interest to those who study antique flags.

Cooper joined the North American Vexillological Association in 1979, serving as treasurer from 1980 to 1983 and president from 1983 to 1986. She was the Association's seventh president and first woman to serve in that position. Cooper also served as editor of the Association's newsletter, NAVA News, from 1987 to 1995; during her tenure, she "significantly raised the quality of NAVA News by publishing information about flag–related events in Canada and the United States." The Association honored her with its Whitney Smith Award, for an outstanding contribution to North American vexillology, in 1994.

== Selected works ==
- Cooper, Grace R. Thirteen-star Flags: Keys to Identification. Washington, D.C: Smithsonian Institution Press, 1973.
- Cooper, Grace R. The Invention of the Sewing Machine. Washington, D.C: Smithsonian Institution, 1968. Second edition 1976. ISBN 9780874743302
- Cooper, Grace R. The Copp Family Textiles. Washington D.C.: Smithsonian Institution Press, 1971.
- Cooper, Grace R. The Scholfield Wool-Carding Machines. Washington: Smithsonian Institution, 1959.
