= Iron Mountain (Napa County, California) =

Mountain in Napa County, California, USA

- Location within California

Highest point
- Elevation: 2,287 ft (697 m) NAVD 88
- Coordinates: 38°33′02″N 122°16′06″W

Geography
- Location: Napa County, California, U.S.
- Topo map: USGS Chiles Valley

Iron Mountain, located in Napa County, California, is approximately 2 miles from the western shore of Lake Berryessa.
