= Ore Mountains (disambiguation) =

The Ore Mountains are a mountain range in Central Europe.

Ore Mountains may also refer to:

- the Serbian Ore Mountains, the southwestern foothills of the Carpathians
- The Slovak Ore Mountains, in eastern Slovakia
- The Transylvanian Ore Mountains (Romanian: Munţii Metaliferi), in Romania, part of the Apuseni Mountains
