= Iron Mountain (Oregon) =

Mountain in Oregon, US

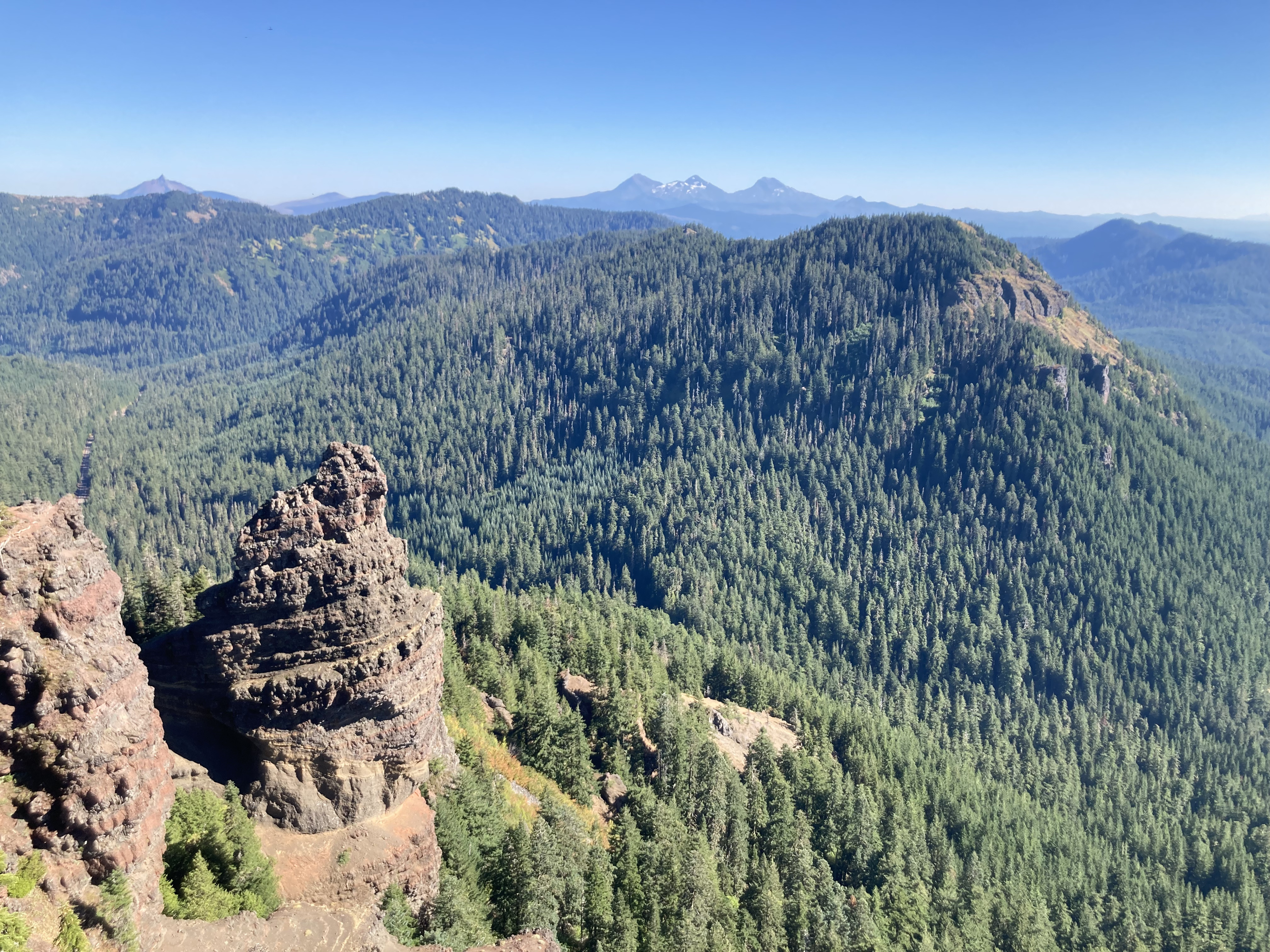
- View from Iron Mountain including Three Sisters and Mount Washington

Highest point
- Elevation: 5,455 ft (1,663 m)
- Coordinates: 44°24′03″N 122°08′56″W

Geography
- Location within Oregon
- Location: Linn County
- Parent range: Cascades

Geology
- Mountain type: Volcanic mountain
- Volcanic arc: Cascade Volcanic Arc

Climbing
- Easiest route: Trail

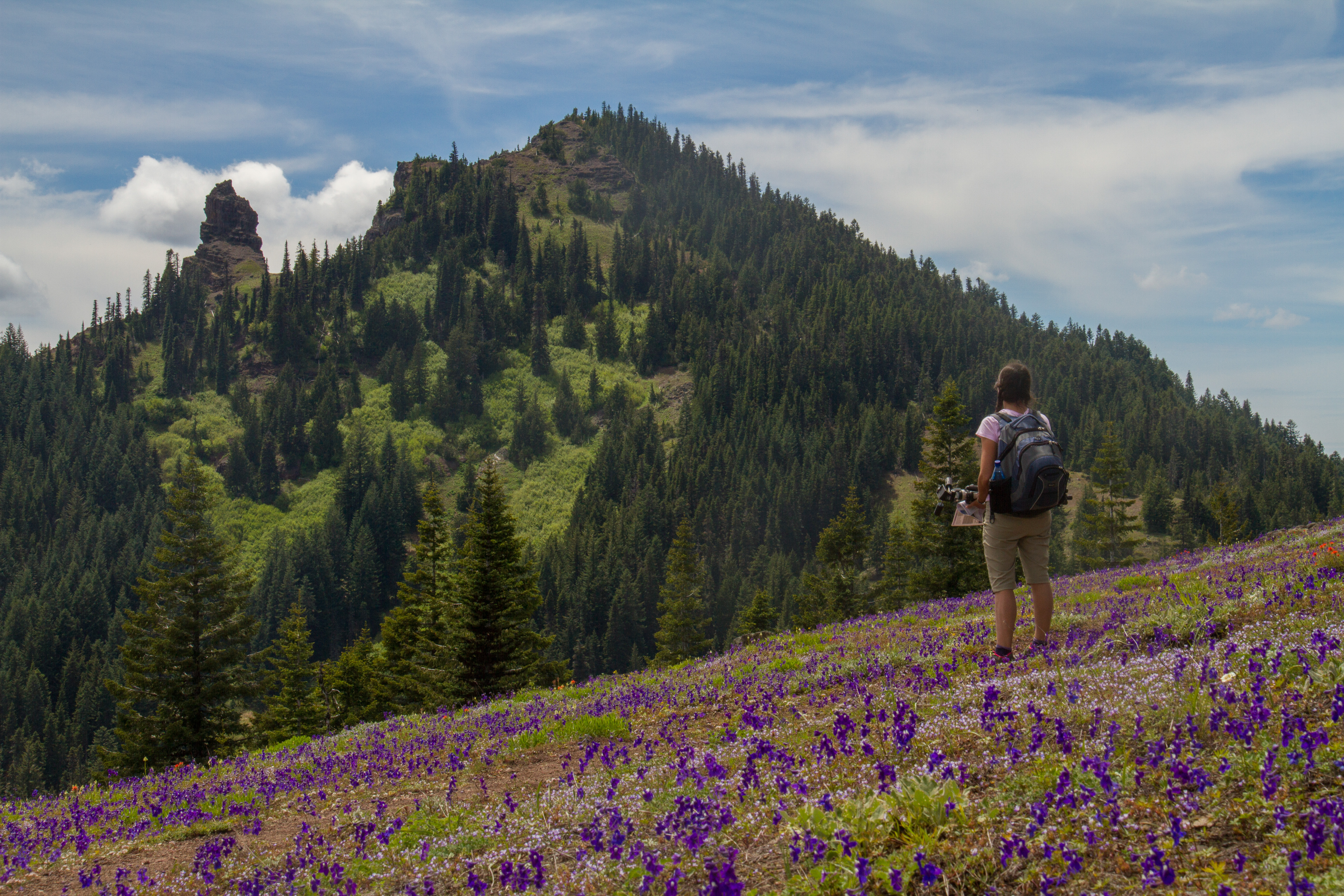
A hiker on the Iron Mountain trail surrounded by wildflowers

Iron Mountain is a mountain located in the Willamette National Forest of Oregon. The mountain is best known for its hike that leads to the top. The top provides views of nearby mountains such as Mt. Jefferson. The top also has a platform for hikers to relax and take in the view.
