= Iron Hill (Delaware) =

Geographical feature near Newark, Delaware, United States

- Location within Delaware

Highest point
- Elevation: 328 ft (100 m)
- Coordinates: 39°38′19″N 75°45′06″W

Geography
- Location: Newark, Delaware

Iron Hill is a prominent geographical feature in the vicinity of Newark, Delaware, in the United States. With a topographic prominence of 200 feet (61 m), it is the most prominent hill in Delaware. However, its peak elevation of 328 feet (100 m) means that it is not the state's highest point, which is located in the Piedmont plateau region near Centreville where a peak elevation of 448 feet (137 m) is attained at Ebright Azimuth. The hill is named for its iron deposits, which were mined over a 200-year period during the 18th and 19th centuries. It is part of a New Castle County park known as Iron Hill Park.

== Location ==
Iron Hill is located just south of Newark in Pencader Hundred, with the summit lying south of Interstate 95 and west of Delaware Route 896. It is the easternmost and highest of three geologically similar peaks, together with neighboring Chestnut Hill and Gray's Hill (across the border in Maryland).

== Geology ==
Iron Hill and the two neighboring hills are outlying Piedmont outcroppings, east of the fall line and surrounded by the relatively flat Atlantic coastal plain. The hills are igneous intrusions of "Iron Hill Gabbro", a coarse and dark-colored rock composed mainly of plagioclase, pyroxenes, and olivine. The rock contains significant iron oxide deposits in the form of hematite, goethite, and limonite, forming the basis for historical iron mining activity. Jasper is also present and was used for toolmaking by prehistoric inhabitants of the area.

== Magnetic influence ==
The slight magnetic effect due to the iron oxides in the jasper rock within Iron Hill can cause inaccuracies in compass readings.

== History ==
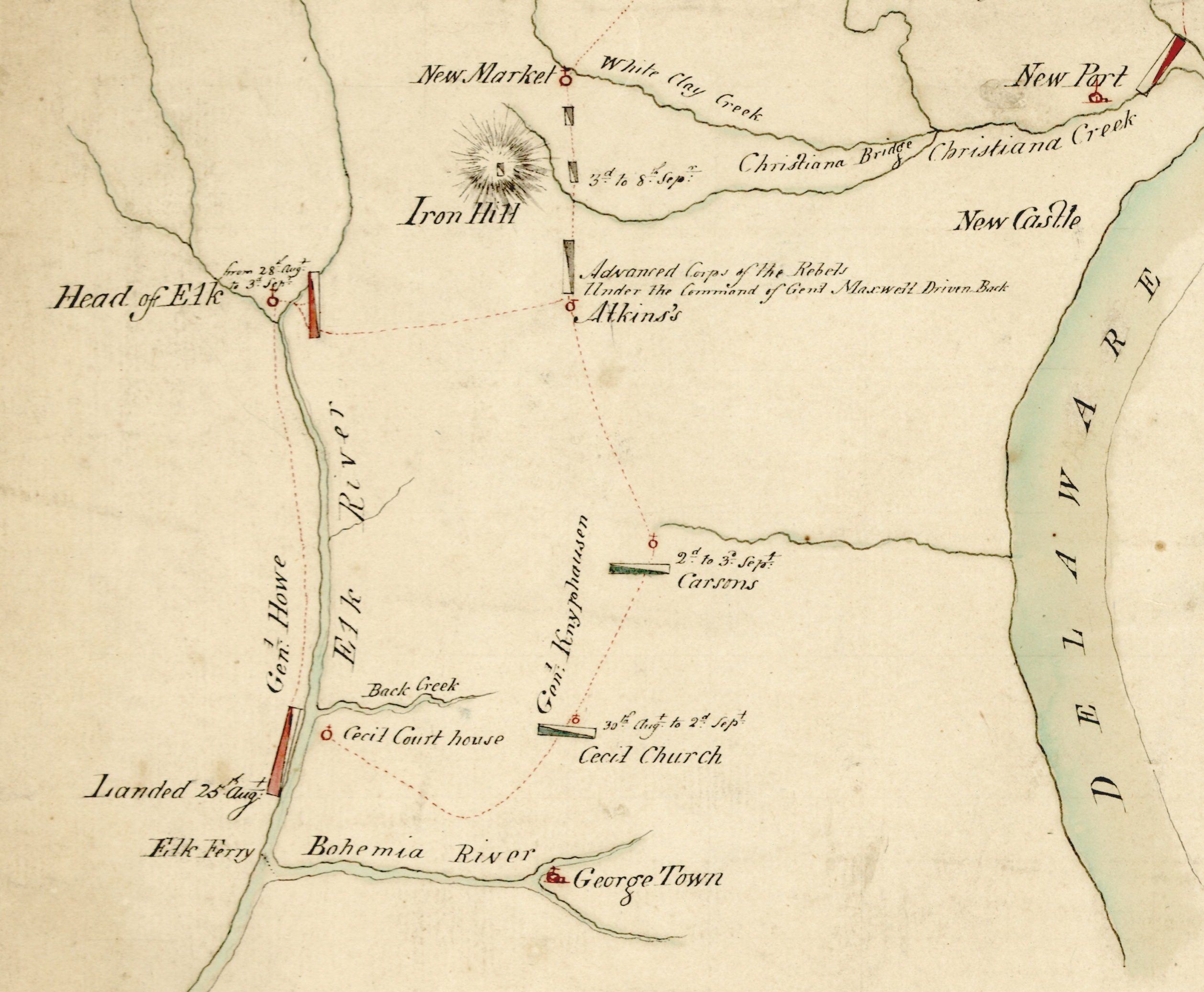
Troop movements around Iron Hill during the Battle of Cooch's Bridge depicted on a period map

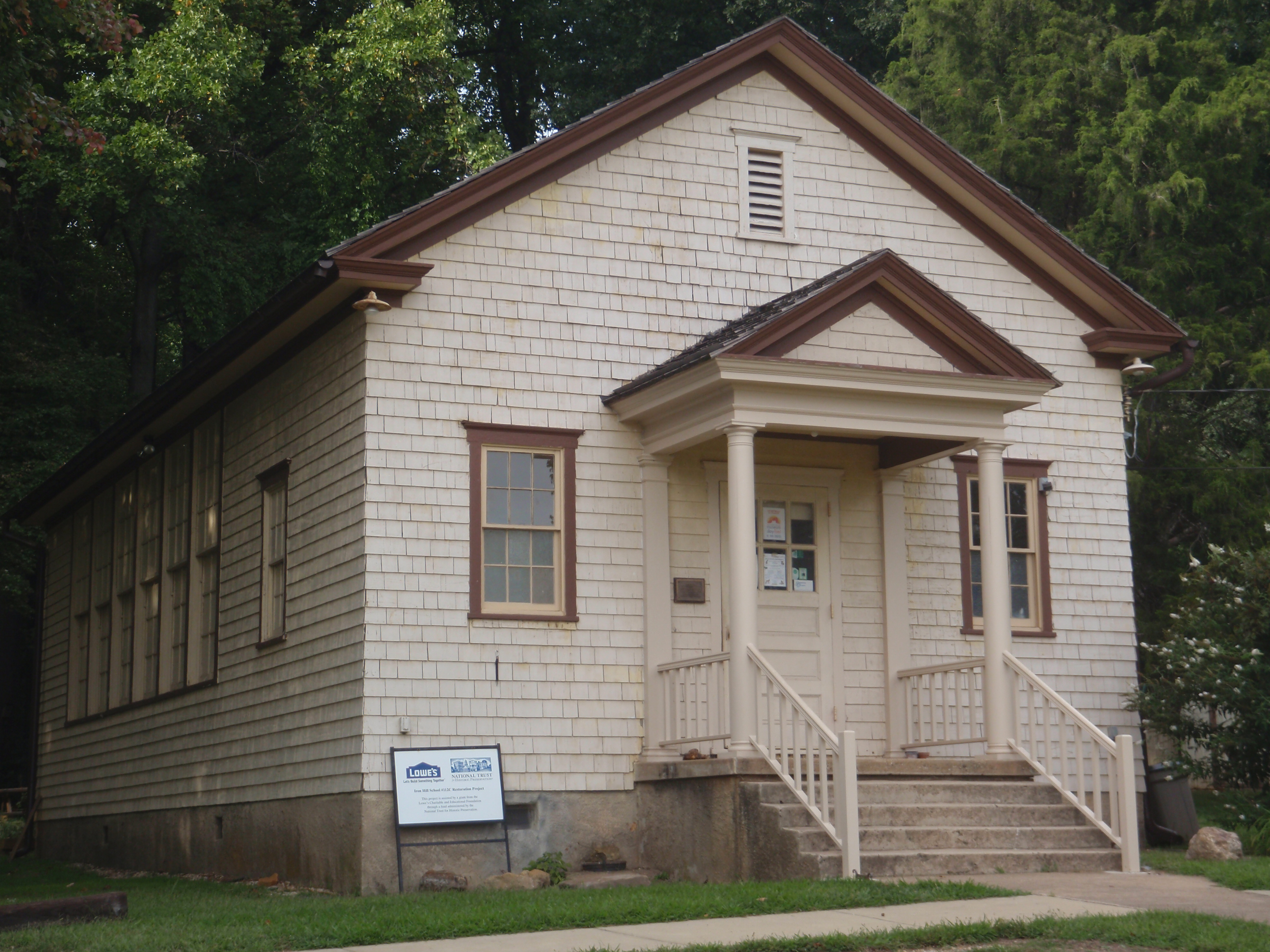
Iron Hill School, built in 1923

Human activity in the area dates to prehistoric times, when Native Americans quarried jasper from Iron Hill to make arrowheads and other stone tools. The location was first referred to in print on Augustine Herman's 1670 map of Virginia and Maryland, where it was labeled "Yron Hill". In 1701, the hill was included in the 30,000-acre (12,000 ha) Welsh Tract, granted by William Penn to a group of settlers fleeing religious persecution in Wales. The Welsh settlers were familiar with ironworking and mining techniques, and soon commenced open-pit mining operations on Iron Hill.

During the Revolutionary War, Iron Hill and the surrounding area were the site of the Battle of Cooch's Bridge (also known as the Battle of Iron Hill) in September 1777. George Washington ascended the hill to observe enemy troop movements prior to the battle, which was possible at the time due to deforestation; subsequent regrowth has since obscured the view from the summit.

Mining on Iron Hill continued until the late 19th century, though extraction of the low-grade ore proved minimally profitable and many of the ventures ended in bankruptcy. The last mining operation on Iron Hill was run by J.P. Whitaker, who shipped the ore to Principio Furnace in Maryland for smelting. African-American mine workers and their descendants continued to inhabit the area and, in 1923, Pierre S. du Pont funded the construction of Iron Hill School No. 112C to serve this population. The school remained in operation until Delaware public schools were desegregated in 1965 and now houses the Iron Hill Museum. Much of the hill is now a wooded recreation area, Iron Hill Park.
