= Cooch's Bridge =

Bridge in Delaware, U.S.

- Cooch's Bridge Historic District
- U.S. National Register of Historic Places
- U.S. Historic district
- Location within Delaware Location within the United States
- Nearest city: Newark, Delaware
- Coordinates: 39.640073°N 75.736409°W
- Built: 1726
- Architectural style: Greek Revival, Second Empire, Georgian
- NRHP reference No.: 73000528; 97000790 (decrease)

Significant dates
- Added to NRHP: April 11, 1973
- Boundary decrease: December 12, 1999

Cooch's Bridge is a historic district located at Old Baltimore Pike, Newark, Delaware, and is the site of the 1777 Battle of Cooch's Bridge. While there are several modern bridges near the site of the battle, the original bridge was in poor shape in 1777, and did not survive the American Revolution.

== Battle of Cooch's Bridge ==
Fought on September 3, 1777, the Battle of Cooch's Bridge has two principal distinctions. It was the only battle of the American Revolutionary War fought on Delaware soil, and has been called the first time that the Stars and Stripes was flown in battle. This second claim is based on circumstantial evidence and has since been called into question.

The battle was fought between British and Hessian troops under Generals Cornwallis, Howe, and Knyphausen and the Colonial troops under General Washington.

The engagement began August 30, about two miles (3 km) south of the bridge. The Americans harried the lead forces of the British Army using guerrilla techniques learned from the Native Americans. However, the roughly 700 Colonials were greatly outmanned and outgunned, and were driven back by the advancing British.

By September 3 the Colonials had dropped back to Cooch's Bridge. A handpicked regiment of 100 marksmen under General William Maxwell laid an ambush in the surrounding cover. Over the ensuing battle, several British and Hessian charges were repelled, but the Americans soon depleted their ammunition and called a retreat.

The property was taken by the British and several buildings were burned. General Cornwallis used the Cooch house as his headquarters for the next week as the British regrouped. American casualties numbered around 30.

Shortly after General Howe moved his troops out. On September 11 he defeated the Colonials in the Battle of Brandywine and subsequently captured the Colonial capital of Philadelphia.

== Signage ==
There are two sets of monuments/signs:

- in the Pencader Heritage Museum parking lot: 39.63966°N 75.72999°W
- across the railroad tracks on Dayett Mills Road, just south of the Old Baltimore Pike: 39.64103°N 75.73234°W
