= Bailleul =

Bailleul may refer to:

== France ==
- Bailleul, Nord, in the Nord département
- Bailleul, Orne, in the Orne département
- Bailleul, Somme, in the Somme département
- Bailleul-aux-Cornailles, in the Pas-de-Calais département
- Bailleul-la-Vallée, in the Eure département
- Bailleul-le-Soc, in the Oise département
- Bailleul-lès-Pernes, in the Pas-de-Calais département
- Bailleul-Neuville, in the Seine-Maritime département
- Bailleul-Sir-Berthoult, in the Pas-de-Calais département
- Bailleul-sur-Thérain, in the Oise département

== Belgium ==
- Bailleul, Belgium, part of the municipality of Estaimpuis
