= Lord Richard Percy =

English zoologist

- Born: 11 February 1921; Northumberland, England
- Died: 20 December 1989 (aged 68); Northumberland, England
- Education: Eton College; Christ Church, Oxford; Sandhurst; King's College
- Occupations: Zoologist, educator
- Known for: Research on lampreys
- Spouse(s): Sarah Norton (m. 1966; died 1978) Clayre Campbell (m. 1979)
- Children: 2
- Parents: Alan Percy, 8th Duke of Northumberland (father); Helen Gordon Lennox (mother)
- Relatives: George Percy, 9th Duke of Northumberland (brother); Hugh Percy, 10th Duke of Northumberland (brother); Elizabeth Douglas-Hamilton, Duchess of Hamilton (sister)
- Military career
- Allegiance: United Kingdom
- Branch: British Army
- Rank: Lieutenant-Colonel
- Unit: Grenadier Guards
- Commands: Northumberland Hussars
- Wars: World War II

Lord Richard Percy (11 February 1921 – 20 December 1989) was an English zoologist with an aristocratic and military background, best known for his specialist research on lampreys. He had a long association with Newcastle University and the field of Northumbrian natural history. Having published some work in East Africa in the early 1950s, he also undertook research on behalf of the U.K. government into the ecology of seabirds in the Seychelles.

== Early life ==
Lord Richard Charles Percy was born on 11 February 1921 at Alnwick Castle, a younger son of the 8th Duke of Northumberland and Lady Helen Gordon Lennox. He was educated at Eton College and Christ Church, Oxford. Queen Mary and Princess Victoria were among his godparents, and he was page to HRH Prince Arthur of Connaught at the Coronation of George VI in 1937: his photographic portrait by Madame Yevonde as Prince Arthur's page is in the National Portrait Gallery.

As a child in 1924 he was painted with his sister, Lady Diana Percy, by Philip de László. In 1937 László requested the loan of the portrait for his large exhibition at Wildenstein's in London, saying he considered it to be "one of the most outstanding children's pictures of [his]".

== Military service ==
Having spent only a year at Christ Church, he went to Sandhurst in 1940 and was commissioned into the Grenadier Guards in 1941. His service number was 200087. From June 1944 he served with the Regiment's 1st (Motor) Battalion in the Guards Armoured Division as they advanced through Normandy and on into Germany – for a time acting as Air Liaison Officer at Divisional HQ. He was regarded as an "efficient but unconventional" officer, playing the organ in every village church his Battalion liberated and keeping a Hardy 'smuggler' fishing rod in his armoured car throughout the campaign. In 1946 he retired from the regular army with the rank of Major.

In 1947 he joined the Yeomanry regiment, the Northumberland Hussars, and was Lieutenant-Colonel commanding 1958–1961; he kept a Crusader tank in his own garage when the army was unwilling to house it. His last military duty was to organise the Presentation of the Guidon to the Northumberland Hussars, the first and only such occasion since the Regiment’s foundation in 1819. The occasion was recorded in watercolour by Lionel Edwards.

He was a Deputy Lieutenant for Northumberland from 1968.

== Naturalist ==
In the early 1950s, Percy and Matthew Ridley travelled around East Africa and published a number of papers in natural history journals. In 1955 they were asked by the Colonial Office to investigate the exploitation of sea birds in the Seychelles (where the eggs yolks of the Sooty Tern were harvested, barrelled and exported in huge quantities for use in the food manufacturing industry). Their work entailed spending four months on an uninhabited island and caught the attention of the author, Ian Fleming, who was at that time also working on a Seychelles project and considering the islands as a backdrop for a James Bond novel.

For many years Percy was chairman of the National Trust committee which managed the Farne Islands. He was also Vice-President of the Chillingham Wild Cattle Association from 1974 to 1988.

== Zoological work and lamprey research ==
After the war he completed at King's College, Durham University the Zoology degree he had begun at Oxford in 1939. King's College became Newcastle University in 1963 and Percy became a lecturer in Zoology there for 35 years – often combining his interest in salmon and trout fishing with his work. There was a ready supply of lampreys for his aquarium in the rivers he fished for salmon.

He shunned publicity and resisted promotion in the university, preferring instead to undertake his research from the laboratory, aquarium and photographic darkroom which he kept at his home in Northumberland. He conducted detailed microscopic research into the formation of red blood cells, blood circulation and the heart in lampreys. His work on this subject, much of it undertaken and co-authored with Ian Potter of Murdoch University, Western Australia, was mainly published in The Journal of the Zoological Society of London between 1975 and 1991.

== Family ==
He married Sarah Jane Elizabeth Norton (born 21 October 1937, died 3 July 1978) on 10 September 1966. They had two sons.

He married secondly, in December 1979, the Hon. Clayre Campbell (who had previously been married to the Hon. Nicholas Ridley, MP).

Lord Richard Percy died at his home in Northumberland on 20 December 1989.
