= Alan Percy, 8th Duke of Northumberland =

British peer & army officer

His Grace The Duke of Northumberland KG, CBE, MVO, TD
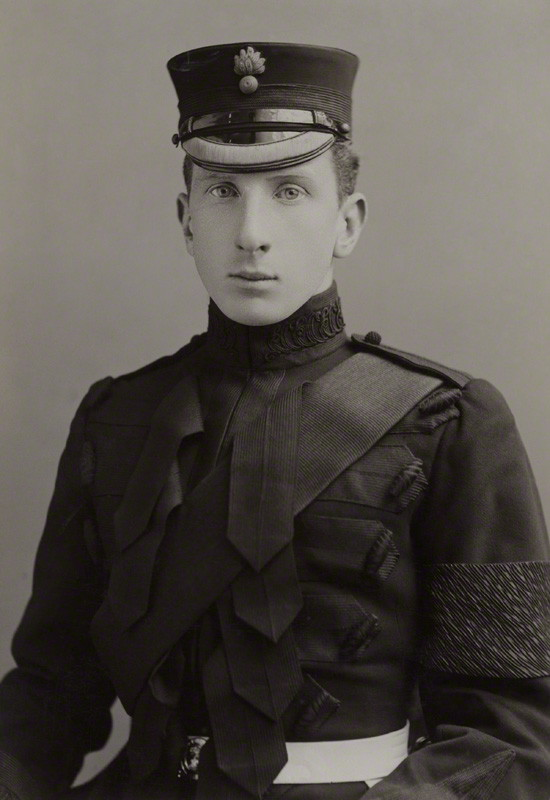
- Alan Ian Percy, in a Grenadier Guards uniform, by Alexander Bassano – 1900s

Lord Lieutenant of Northumberland
- In office 19 July 1918 – 23 August 1930

Personal details
- Born: 17 April 1880 London
- Died: 23 August 1930 (aged 50) London
- Spouse: Lady Helen Gordon-Lennox (m. 1911)
- Children: 6, including Henry, Hugh, and Elizabeth
- Parent(s): Henry Percy, 7th Duke of Northumberland; Lady Edith Campbell

Alan Ian Percy, 8th Duke of Northumberland, KG, CBE, MVO, TD (17 April 1880 – 23 August 1930) was a British peer, army officer, and newspaper proprietor.

== Early life ==
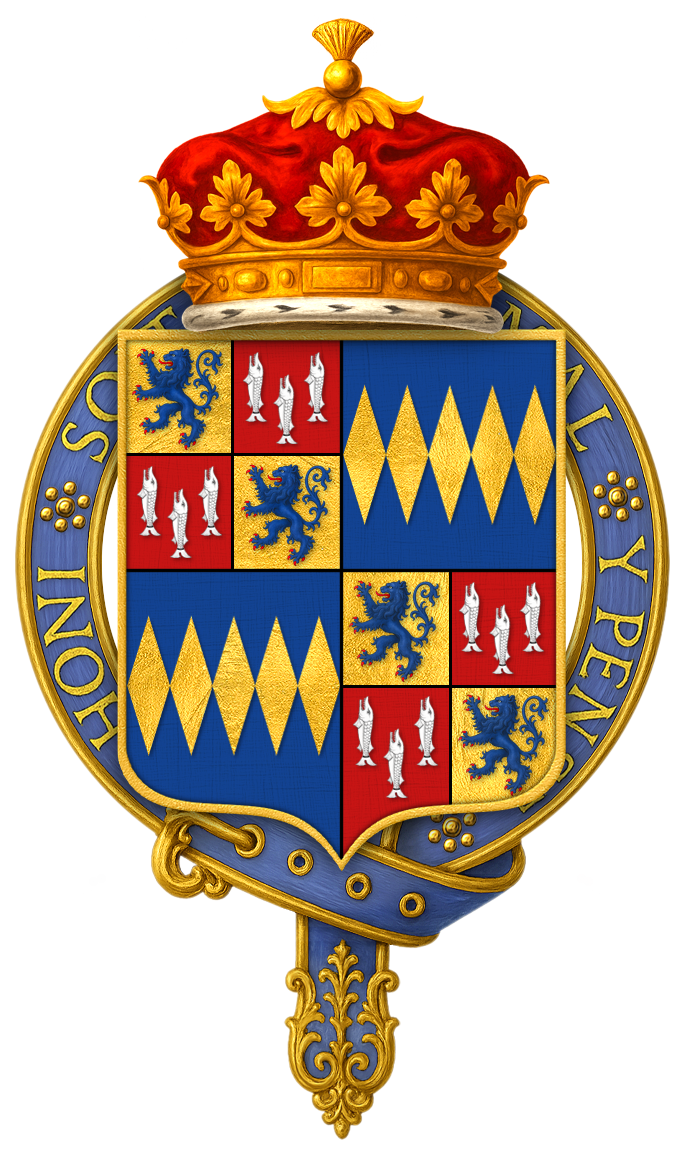
Garter-encircled shield of arms

Percy was born in London on 17 April 1880. He was the son of Henry Percy, 7th Duke of Northumberland, and Lady Edith Campbell (a daughter of George Campbell, 8th Duke of Argyll).

Among his siblings were his elder brother Henry Algernon George Percy, Earl Percy (who died unmarried), Lady Victoria Alexandra Percy (wife of Sir Robert Tidmarsh), Lady Mary Percy (who married Aymer Edward Maxwell, they were parents of author Gavin Maxwell), Lord William Richard Percy, Lord James Percy (who died unmarried), and Lord Eustace Sutherland Campbell Percy (who was created 1st Baron Percy of Newcastle).

== Career ==
Portrait by Hugh De Twenebrokes Glazebrook, 1923

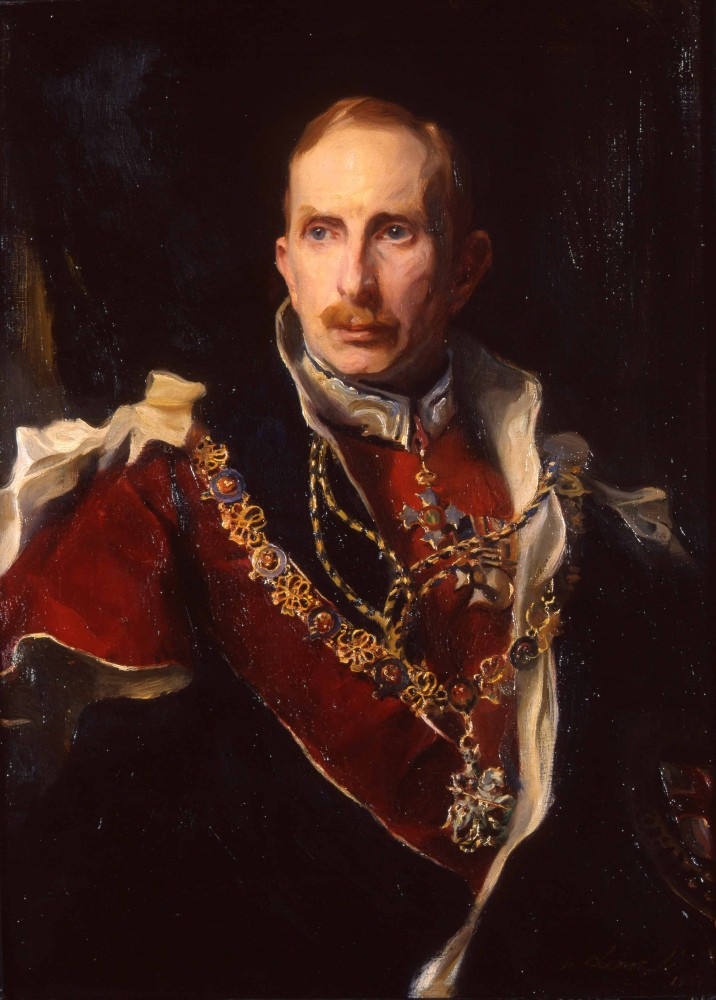
Portrait of the Duke by Philip de Laszlo, 1927

=== Military career ===
Percy was a second lieutenant of the 2nd Volunteer Battalion the Queen's (Royal West Surrey Regiment), when he was admitted as a second lieutenant in the Grenadier Guards on 24 January 1900. He was part of a detachment sent to South Africa in March 1900 to reinforce the 3rd battalion during the Second Boer War, and served with his regiment there until the war ended. For his service, he received the Queen's South Africa Medal. Following the end of the war, he returned to the United Kingdom in August 1902. During his time as ADC to the Governor General of Canada, he undertook a wager to walk 111 miles from one city to another in three days—despite blizzards and heavy snowfall, he completed the challenge and won the wager. During the First World War he served with the Grenadier Guards, working with the Intelligence Department to provide eyewitness accounts of battles and the front line. His brother Lord William Percy also served during the war; wounded in 1915, he spent the remainder of the war working as a military attorney. He was made a Chevalier of the Légion d'honneur. On 1 October 1918 he was appointed Honorary Colonel of the 3rd (Reserve) Battalion, Queen's (Royal West Surrey Regiment).

=== Political activities ===
Politically Percy was a Tory diehard. He was a staunch supporter of the House of Lords. He wrote for the National Review on military matters.

From 1921, he funded the Boswell Publishing Company, and then in 1922 until his death, the Patriot, a radical right-wing weekly which published articles by Nesta Webster and promulgated a mix of anti-communism and antisemitism.

In 1924, he acquired an interest in The Morning Post.

=== Other activities ===
The Duke was appointed Lord Lieutenant of Northumberland. For one year before his death, he served as Chancellor of the University of Durham, a role his father had also held. His father, the 7th Duke, was an alderman on the Middlesex County Council up to his death. In July 1918, he was chosen to fill the vacancy on the council in his father's place.

In 1930, the Duke wrote a short story The Shadow on the Moor, a fox-hunting ghost story in the manner of M R James set in Northumberland, in which the hunter becomes the hunted. Originally privately published, the story remains in print as a short novella.

== Personal life ==
On 18 October 1911, Percy married Lady Helen Magdalen Gordon-Lennox (daughter of Charles Gordon-Lennox, 7th Duke of Richmond). They had six children:

- Henry George Alan Percy, 9th Duke of Northumberland (1912–1940), who was killed in action on 21 May 1940.
- Hugh Algernon Percy, 10th Duke of Northumberland (1914–1988), who married Lady Elizabeth Montagu Douglas Scott in 1946.
- Lady Elizabeth Ivy Percy (1916–2008), who married Douglas Douglas-Hamilton, 14th Duke of Hamilton in 1937.
- Lady Diana Evelyn Percy (1917–1978), who married John Egerton, 6th Duke of Sutherland in 1939.
- Lord Richard Charles Percy (1921–1989); who was a zoologist at Newcastle University for 36 years; he married Sarah Jane Elizabeth Norton, a daughter of Petre Norton of The Manor House, Whalton, in 1966. After her death in 1978, he married Hon. Clayre Campbell in 1979.
- Lord Geoffrey William Percy (1925–1984), who married Mary Elizabeth Lea in 1955.

The 8th Duke died in London on 23 August 1930 and was buried in the Northumberland Vault, within Westminster Abbey. He was succeeded in the dukedom and his other titles by his eldest son, George.

== Works ==
- A Year Ago: Eye-witness's Narrative of the War from March 30th to July 18, 1915, with E. D. Swinton, Longmans, Green & Co., 1916.
- "The Realities of the Situation," The Patriot, Vol. I, No. 1, 9 February 1922.
- First Jewish Bid For World Power, Reprinted from the Patriot, January, 1930.
- The Shadow on the Moor, 1930
- "La Salamandre" The story of a vivandière 1934

Other

- W. H. Mallock, Democracy being an abridged edition of 'The limits of pure democracy' Democracy; being an Abridged Edition of 'The Limits of Pure Democracy'], with an introduction by the Duke of Northumberland, Chapman & Hall, Ltd., 1924.

Peerage of Great Britain
Preceded by Henry Percy	Duke of Northumberland; 1918–1930	Succeeded by Henry Percy
Honorary titles
Preceded by The Duke of Northumberland	Lord Lieutenant of Northumberland; 1918–1930	Succeeded by Sir Charles Trevelyan, Bt
Academic offices
Preceded by The Earl of Durham	Chancellor of the University of Durham; 1929–1930	Succeeded by The Marquess of Londonderry
Professional and academic associations
Preceded by William Brown	President of the Surtees Society; 1925–30	Succeeded by Henry Gee
