= List of protected heritage sites in Estaimpuis =

This table shows an overview of the protected heritage sites in the Walloon town Estaimpuis (in Dutch Steenput). This list is part of Belgium's national heritage.

Object	Year/architect	Town/section	Address	Coordinates	Number^{?}	Image
Church of Saint-Amand ^{(nl)} ^{(fr)}		Estaimpuis	Bailleul	50.668807°N 3.317384°E	57027-CLT-0001-01 Info	Kerk Saint-Amand
Church of Saint-Vaast ^{(nl)} ^{(fr)}		Estaimpuis	Evregnies	50.713231°N 3.287033°E	57027-CLT-0002-01 Info	Kerk Saint-Vaast
Ruins of the ancient castle of Royère and environs ^{(nl)} ^{(fr)}		Estaimpuis	Néchin	50.675589°N 3.275937°E	57027-CLT-0003-01 Info	Ruïnes van het oude kasteel van Royère en omgeving
Church ^{(nl)} ^{(fr)}		Estaimpuis	Saint-Léger	50.705708°N 3.314083°E	57027-CLT-0004-01 Info	Kerk
The course of the Walloon Canal Espierre by the municipalities and Estaimpuis Pecq, including the infrastructure of the canal, namely the lock works, three metal drawbridges and towpaths and the rows of poplars along the banks and the establishment of a protection zone around the canal ^{(nl)} ^{(fr)}		Estaimpuis		50.691193°N 3.256318°E	57027-CLT-0005-01 Info	De loop van het Waalse Canal Espierre door de sectionn Estaimpuis en Pecq, waaronder de infrastructuur van het kanaal, namelijk de sluiswachterswerken, drie metalen ophaalbruggen en jaagpaden en de rijen populieren langs de oever en oprichting van een beschermingszone rond het kanaal

== See also ==
- List of protected heritage sites in Hainaut (province)
- Estaimpuis
