= List of protected heritage sites in Pecq, Belgium =

This table shows an overview of the protected heritage sites in the Walloon town Pecq, Belgium. This list is part of Belgium's national heritage.

Object	Year/architect	Town/section	Address	Coordinates	Number^{?}	Image
St. Martin's Church ^{(nl)} ^{(fr)}		Pecq		50.685330°N 3.339870°E	57062-CLT-0001-01 Info	Kerk Saint-Martin
Church of Saint-Eleuthère ^{(nl)} ^{(fr)}		Pecq		50.664736°N 3.348601°E	57062-CLT-0002-01 Info	Kerk Saint-Eleuthère
The course of the Walloon canal of Espierre through the municipalities Estaimpuis and Pecq, including the infrastructure of the canal, namely the lock works, three metal drawbridges, the towpaths and the rows of poplars lining the banks, establishing a protection zone around the canal ^{(nl)} ^{(fr)}		Pecq		50.691193°N 3.256318°E	57062-CLT-0006-01 Info	

== See also ==
- List of protected heritage sites in Hainaut (province)
- Pecq, Belgium
