= Harry Nicholls (VC) =

English Victoria Cross recipient (1915-1975)

- Born: 21 April 1915; Nottingham, Nottinghamshire
- Died: 11 September 1975 (aged 60); Leeds, West Yorkshire
- Burial place: Southern Cemetery, Nottingham
- Military career
- Allegiance: United Kingdom
- Branch: British Army
- Rank: Corporal
- Units: Grenadier Guards
- Conflicts: World War II
- Awards: Victoria Cross

Harry Nicholls VC (21 April 1915 – 11 September 1975) was an English recipient of the Victoria Cross, the highest and most prestigious award for gallantry in the face of the enemy that can be awarded to British and Commonwealth forces.

== Military career ==
He was born on 21 April 1915 and was 25 years old, and a lance-corporal in the 3rd Battalion, Grenadier Guards, British Army during the Second World War when the following deed took place during the Battle of France for which he was awarded the VC.

On 21 May 1940 near the River Escaut, in the village of Esquelmes north of Tournai for 6 km in Belgium, Lance-Corporal Nicholls, although suffering from shrapnel wounds in his arm, continued to lead his section in a counterattack against overwhelming opposition. He advanced over a ridge and when the position became critical, he rushed forward, putting three enemy machine-guns out of action. He then attacked massed enemy infantry beyond a second ridge until his ammunition ran out and he was taken prisoner.

=== Victoria Cross citation ===
The announcement and accompanying citation for the decoration was published in supplement to the London Gazette on 31 July 1940, reading

'War Office, 31st July, 1940

The KING has been graciously pleased to approve the award of the VICTORIA CROSS to:—

Lance Corporal Harry Nicholls, 1st Bn, Grenadier Guards

On the 21st May 1940, Lance Corporal Nicholls was commanding a section in the right-forward platoon of his company when the company was ordered to counter-attack. At the very start of the advance he was wounded in the arm by shrapnel, but continued to lead his section forward; as the company came over a small ridge, the enemy opened heavy machine-gun fire at close range.

Lance Corporal Nicholls, realising the danger to the company, immediately seized a Bren gun and dashed forward towards the machine-guns, firing from the hip. He succeeded in silencing first one machine-gun and then two other machine-guns, in spite of being again severely wounded.

Lance-Corporal Nicholls then went on up to a higher piece of ground and engaged the German infantry massed behind, causing many casualties, and continuing to fire until he had no more ammunition left.

He was wounded at least four times in all, but absolutely refused to give in. There is no doubt that his gallant action was instrumental in enabling his company to reach its objective, and in causing the enemy to fall back across the River Scheldt.

Lance-corporal Nicholls has since been reported to have been killed in action.

Contrary to his citation, Nicholls was taken as a prisoner of war. He was presented with his VC ribbon by a German commandant when he was a prisoner in Poland.

== Legacy ==
His Victoria Cross is displayed at The Guards Regimental Headquarters (Grenadier Guards RHQ), Wellington Barracks in London.
