= Roger Acrode =

Archdeacon

Roger Acrode (also spelt Acroyde, Acrod) was Archdeacon of York from 1600 until 1617.

Acrode was educated at Clare College, Cambridge He held livings at Goldsborough, Whalton, and Bolton Percy.
