= George Percy, 9th Duke of Northumberland =

British nobleman

His Grace The Duke of Northumberland
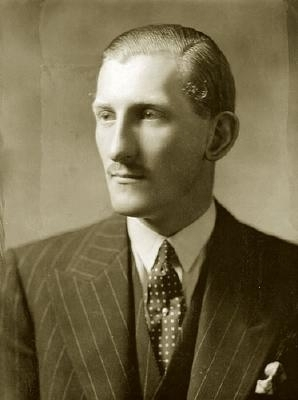

Parliamentary Private Secretary
- In office 1935–1940

Personal details
- Born: Henry George Alan Percy; 15 July 1912
- Died: 21 May 1940 (aged 27) Pecq, Belgium
- Cause of death: Killed in action
- Resting place: Esquelmes War Cemetery
- Parents: Alan Percy; Helen Gordon-Lennox
- Military career
- Allegiance: United Kingdom
- Branch: British Army
- Commands: 3rd Battalion Grenadier Guards

Henry George Alan Percy, 9th Duke of Northumberland (15 July 1912 – 21 May 1940) was the son of Alan Percy, 8th Duke of Northumberland and Lady Helen Gordon-Lennox.

== Life and death ==
He was educated at Eton College. He served as Parliamentary Private Secretary to the Lord Privy Seal in 1935. During his lifetime, the 9th Duke was considered one of Britain's most eligible bachelors.

During the BEF retreat to Dunkirk, Percy served as Lieutenant with the 3rd Battalion Grenadier Guards. He was killed south of Pecq in Belgium, leading a counterattack on German troops fording the Schelde river. His body is interred in the Esquelmes War Cemetery in the village of Esquelmes.

He was succeeded as Duke of Northumberland by his brother Hugh Percy, 10th Duke of Northumberland. A posthumous portrait by Oswald Birley is now displayed at the family seat of Alnwick Castle.

Peerage of Great Britain
Preceded by Alan Percy	Duke of Northumberland; 1930–1940	Succeeded by Hugh Percy
