= Helen Percy, Duchess of Northumberland =

English aristocrat and courtier

Her Grace The Duchess of Northumberland GCVO CBE
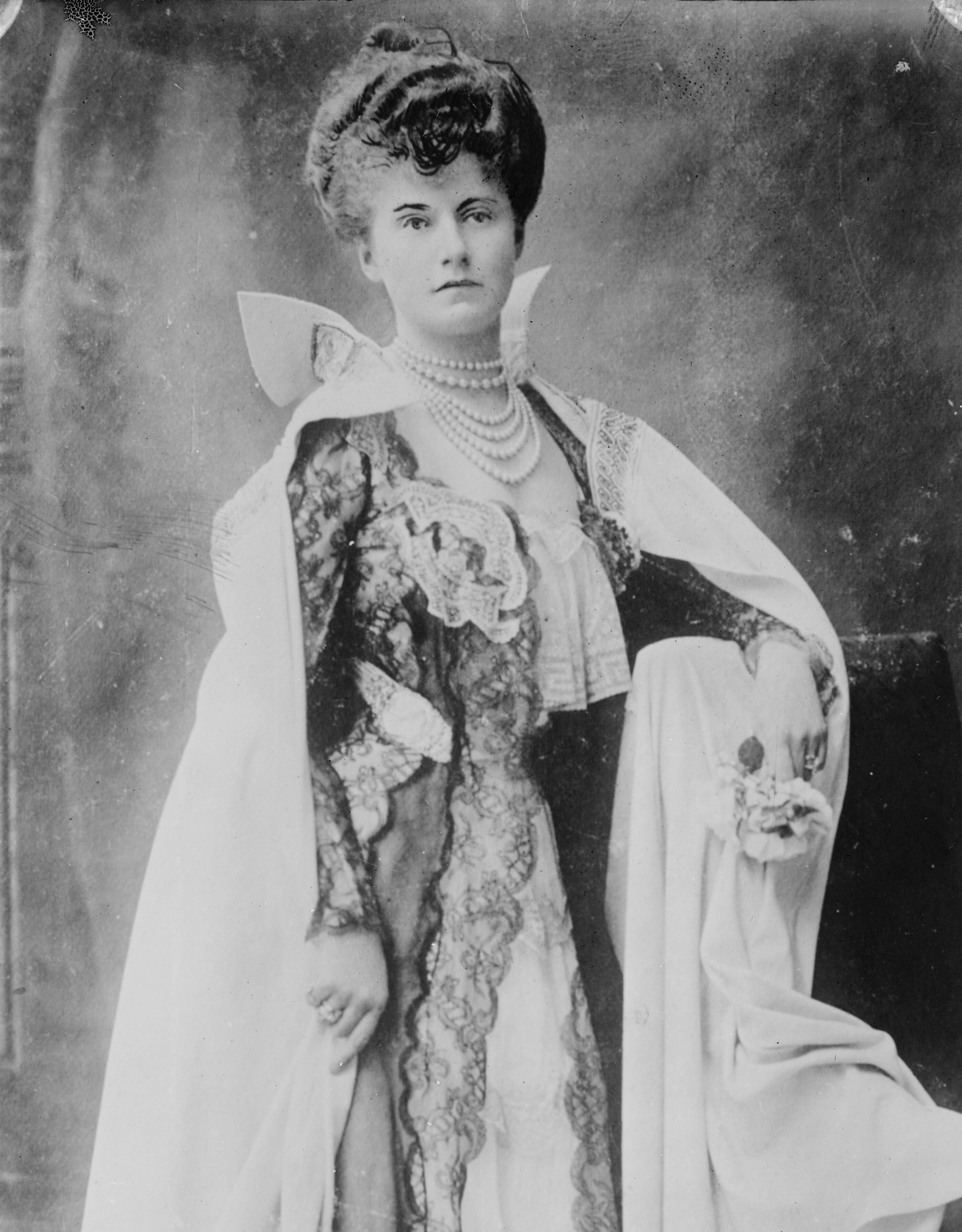
- Lady Helen Gordon-Lennox, c. 1900
- Born: Lady Helen Magdalan Gordon-Lennox; 13 December 1886; Belgravia, London
- Died: 13 June 1965 (aged 78); Alnwick, Northumberland, England
- Spouse: Alan Percy, 8th Duke of Northumberland (m. 1911; died 1930)
- Issue: 6, including Henry, Hugh and Elizabeth
- Father: Charles Gordon-Lennox, 7th Duke of Richmond
- Mother: Isabel Sophie Craven

Helen Percy, Duchess of Northumberland, GCVO CBE JP (née Lady Helen Magdalen Gordon-Lennox; 13 December 1886 – 13 June 1965) was a British aristocrat and courtier. She was Mistress of the Robes to Queen Elizabeth the Queen Mother from 1937–64.

== Early life ==
She was the second daughter of Charles Gordon-Lennox, Earl of March and Kinrara (later the 7th Duke of Richmond), and his second wife, Isabel Sophie Craven, herself the second daughter of William George Craven (a grandson of William Craven, 1st Earl of Craven) and Lady Mary Yorke (second daughter of Charles Yorke, 4th Earl of Hardwicke). From her father's first marriage to Amy Mary Ricardo, she had three half-brothers and two half-sisters, including Charles Gordon-Lennox, 8th Duke of Richmond, Lady Evelyn Gordon-Lennox (wife of Sir John Cotterell, 4th Baronet), Lady Violet Gordon-Lennox (wife of Henry Brassey, 1st Baron Brassey, of Apethorpe), Lord Esmé Charles Gordon-Lennox, and Lord Bernard Charles Gordon-Lennox.

== Career ==
She was Mistress of the Robes to Queen Elizabeth the Queen Mother, from 1937 to 1964 and was appointed a Dame Grand Cross of the Royal Victorian Order in 1938.

== Personal life ==
She was married on 18 October 1911 to Earl Percy, who succeeded his father as 8th Duke of Northumberland in 1918, whereupon she became known as the Duchess of Northumberland. The couple had six children:

- Henry George Alan Percy, 9th Duke of Northumberland (1912–1940), who was killed in action on 21 May 1940.
- Hugh Algernon Percy, 10th Duke of Northumberland (1914–1988).
- Lady Elizabeth Ivy Percy (1916–2008), who married Douglas Douglas-Hamilton, 14th Duke of Hamilton, in 1937.
- Lady Diana Evelyn Percy (1917–1978), who married John Egerton, 6th Duke of Sutherland, in 1939 in Westminster Abbey.
- Lord Richard Charles Percy (1921–1989), who married Sarah Jane Elizabeth Norton, daughter of Petre Norton, in 1966. After her death, he married Hon. Clayre Campbell, daughter of Alastair Campbell, 4th Baron Stratheden and Campbell, in 1979.
- Lord Geoffrey William Percy (1925–1984), who married Mary Elizabeth Lea, daughter of Ralph Lea, in 1955.

The Duchess died in 1965 at Lesbury House, Alnwick.

Court offices
Preceded by —	Mistress of the Robes to Queen Elizabeth the Queen Mother; 1937–1964	Succeeded by The Duchess of Abercorn
