= Estaimbourg =

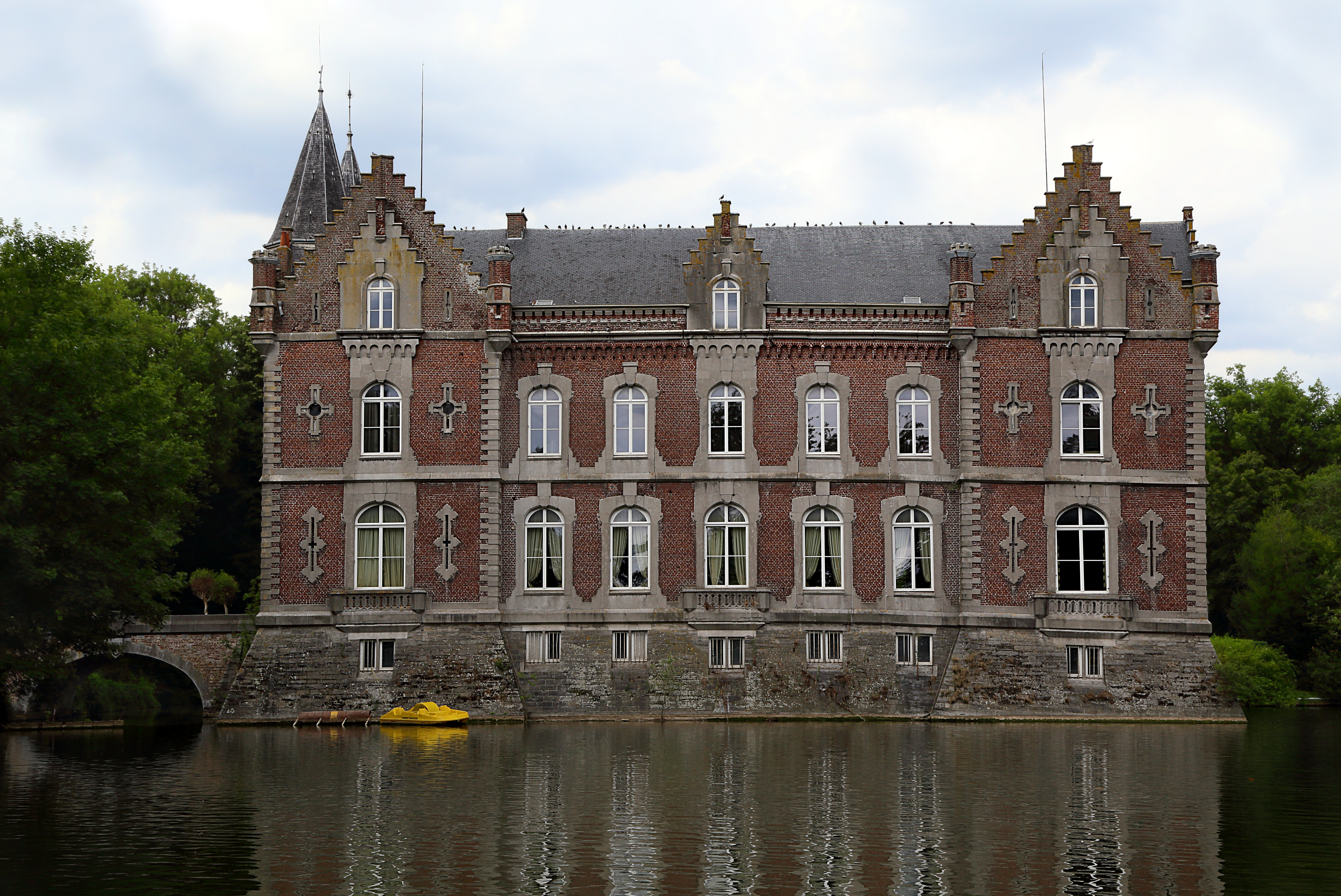
- Château de Bourgogne, Estaimbourg

- Location within Belgium Location within Europe
- Coordinates: 50°40′57″N 03°19′03″E
- Country: Belgium
- Region: Wallonia
- Province: Hainaut
- Municipality: Estaimpuis

Estaimbourg is a village of Wallonia and a district of the municipality of Estaimpuis, located in the province of Hainaut, Belgium.

During the Middle Ages there was both a village and a castle in Estaimbourg. When the village was pillaged by French troops in 1478, they also destroyed the castle. In 1854, the de Bourgogne family built a new château on the ruins of the old castle, in a Neo-Gothic style. The village church is from the late 18th century. Historically, there has been a presence of leather industry in the village.
