= Néchin =

Coordinates: 50.667°N 3.268°E

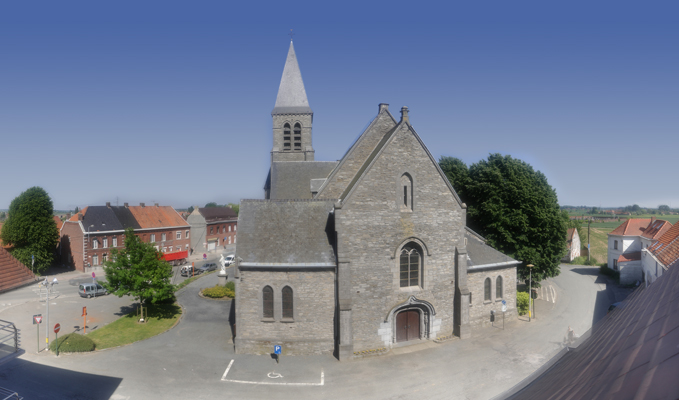
View of Néchin

Néchin (French pronunciation: [neʃɛ̃]) is a town of Wallonia and district of the municipality of Estaimpuis, located in the province of Hainaut, Belgium, near the border with France's Hauts-de-France region. It was a municipality until the fusion of the Belgian municipalities in 1977.

The village of Néchin has become known for the number of French millionaires and billionaires living there. It benefits from its location next to the French border, very close to Lille Métropole metropolitan area, and from Belgium's tax laws which are advantageous to people with high earnings from stock or capital gains, compared to the laws in France. Members of the Mulliez family, owners of the Auchan hypermarket chain and Decathlon sports stores, own a number of properties. The most famous French tax exile in Néchin is actor Gérard Depardieu, who purchased a house there in 2012.

In the early 2010s, Néchin received international media attention when several wealthy French individuals chose to establish residence in the village to benefit from Belgium's tax regime. French newspapers and international media reported that a notable proportion of the residents were French, attracted by lower taxes on wealth and capital gains compared with France. In 2012, French actor Gérard Depardieu bought a property in Néchin and registered as a resident amid changes to French tax laws, a move that drew significant public and political comment in both countries. The presence of affluent expatriates has led to the village sometimes being described in the press as a destination for high-income individuals living near the French border.
