= Elizabeth Douglas-Hamilton, Duchess of Hamilton =

English noblewoman (1916-2008)

Her Grace The Duchess of Hamilton
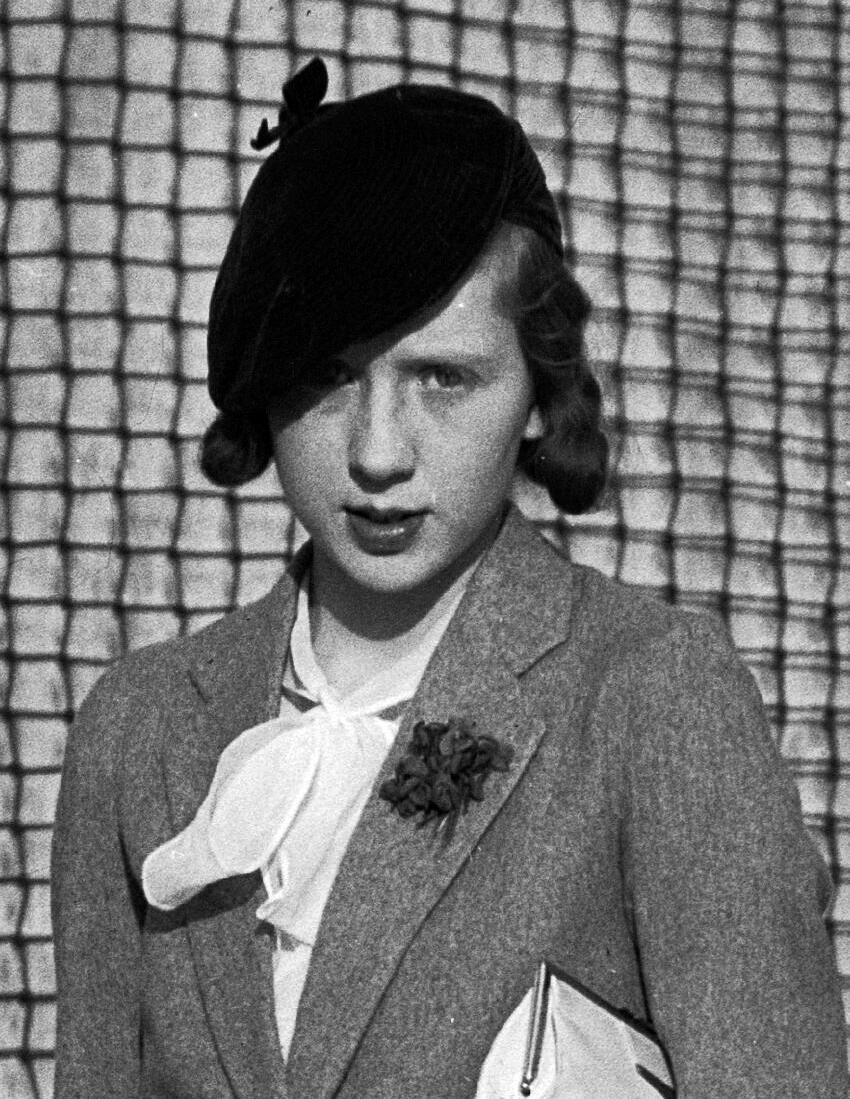
- Lady Elizabeth Percy, 1934
- Born: 25 May 1916
- Died: 16 September 2008 (aged 92)
- Spouse: Douglas Douglas-Hamilton, 14th Duke of Hamilton (m. 1937; died 1973)
- Issue: Angus Douglas-Hamilton, 15th Duke of Hamilton; James Douglas-Hamilton, Baron Selkirk of Douglas; Lord Hugh Douglas-Hamilton; Lord Patrick Douglas-Hamilton; Lord David Douglas-Hamilton
- Parents: Alan Percy, 8th Duke of Northumberland; Helen Gordon-Lennox

Elizabeth Ivy Douglas-Hamilton, Duchess of Hamilton, OBE, DL (25 May 1916 – 16 September 2008), was the daughter of Alan Percy, 8th Duke of Northumberland (1880–1930) and his wife, Helen.

She was born as Lady Elizabeth Ivy Percy at Alnwick Castle in Northumberland and spent her youth between there, Albury House in Surrey and Syon House in Middlesex. She was married in 1937 to Douglas Douglas-Hamilton (the then Marquess of Douglas and Clydesdale), who subsequently became the 14th Duke of Hamilton and 11th Duke of Brandon.

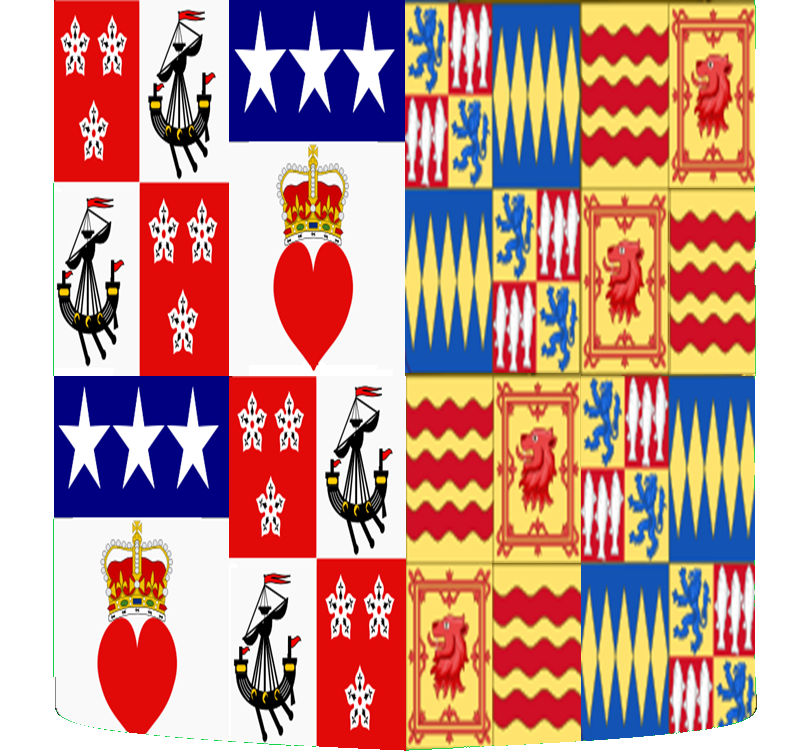
The arms of the Dukes of Hamilton impaled with the arms of the Dukes of Northumberland
