= Bailleul, Belgium =

Bailleul
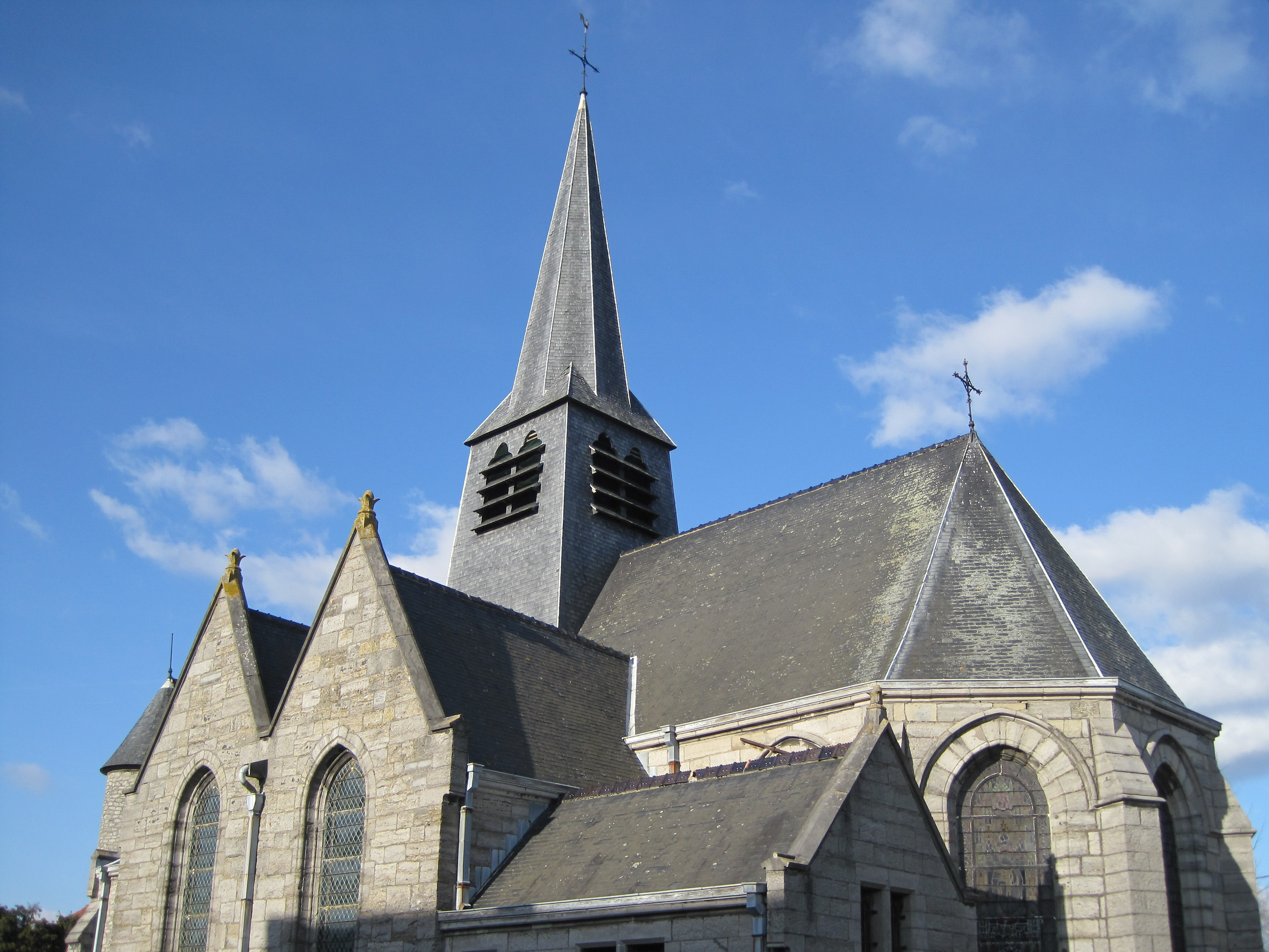
- Bailleul, village church

- Coat of arms

- Location within Belgium Location within Europe
- Coordinates: 50°40′09″N 03°19′03″E
- Country: Belgium
- Region: Wallonia
- Province: Hainaut
- Municipality: Estaimpuis

Bailleul is a village of Wallonia and a district of the municipality of Estaimpuis, located in the province of Hainaut, Belgium.

The village has been known to exist since at least 864, when it was mentioned for the first time. The village church contains funerary monuments from the 18th and 19th century. Historian Joseph Alexis Poutrain was from Bailleul.
