= Estaimpuis =

Municipality in Hainaut Province, Wallonia, Belgium

Estaimpuis Timpu (Picard): Steenput (Dutch)
- Municipality
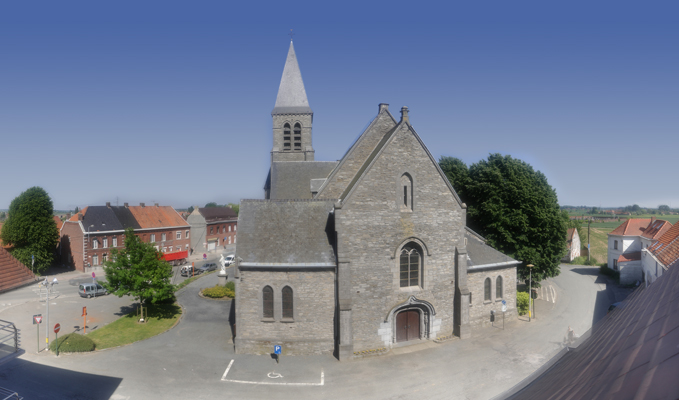
- Néchin

- Flag Coat of arms

- The municipality in the province of Hainaut
- Interactive map of Estaimpuis
- Location in Belgium
- Coordinates: 50°42′N 03°16′E
- Country: Belgium
- Community: French Community
- Region: Wallonia
- Province: Hainaut
- Arrondissement: Tournai-Mouscron

Government
  - Mayor: Daniel Senesael (PS)
  - Governing party: PS

Area
  - Total: 32.08 km^{2} (12.39 sq mi)

Population (2026-01-01)
  - Total: 10,915
  - Density: 340.2/km^{2} (881.2/sq mi)
- Postal codes: 7730
- NIS code: 57027
- Area codes: 069
- Website: www.estaimpuis.be

Estaimpuis (French pronunciation: [etɛ̃pɥi] or [etɛ̃pwi]; Dutch: Steenput; Picard: Timpu) is a municipality of Wallonia located in the province of Hainaut, Belgium.

It consists of the following districts: Bailleul, Estaimbourg, Estaimpuis, Évregnies, Leers-Nord, Néchin, and Saint-Léger, Estaimpuis.

The municipality is located in Picardy Wallonia.

== Geography ==
The different sections of Estaimpuis

Villages (former municipalities) in the municipality:

- Estaimpuis (I)
- Évregnies (II)
- Saint-Léger (III)
- Estaimbourg (IV)
- Leers-Nord (V)
- Néchin (VI)
- Bailleul (VII)

Neighbouring villages (and the municipalities to which they belong) in Belgium:

- Herseaux (Mouscron) (a)
- Dottignies (Mouscron) (b)
- Espierres (Spiere-Helkijn) (c)
- Warcoing (Pecq) (d)
- Pecq (Pecq) (e)
- Esquelmes (Pecq) (f)
- Ramegnies-Chin (Tournai) (g)
- Templeuve (Tournai) (h)

Neighbouring municipalities in France:

- Wattrelos (k)
- Leers (j)
- Toufflers (i)

== Gallery ==
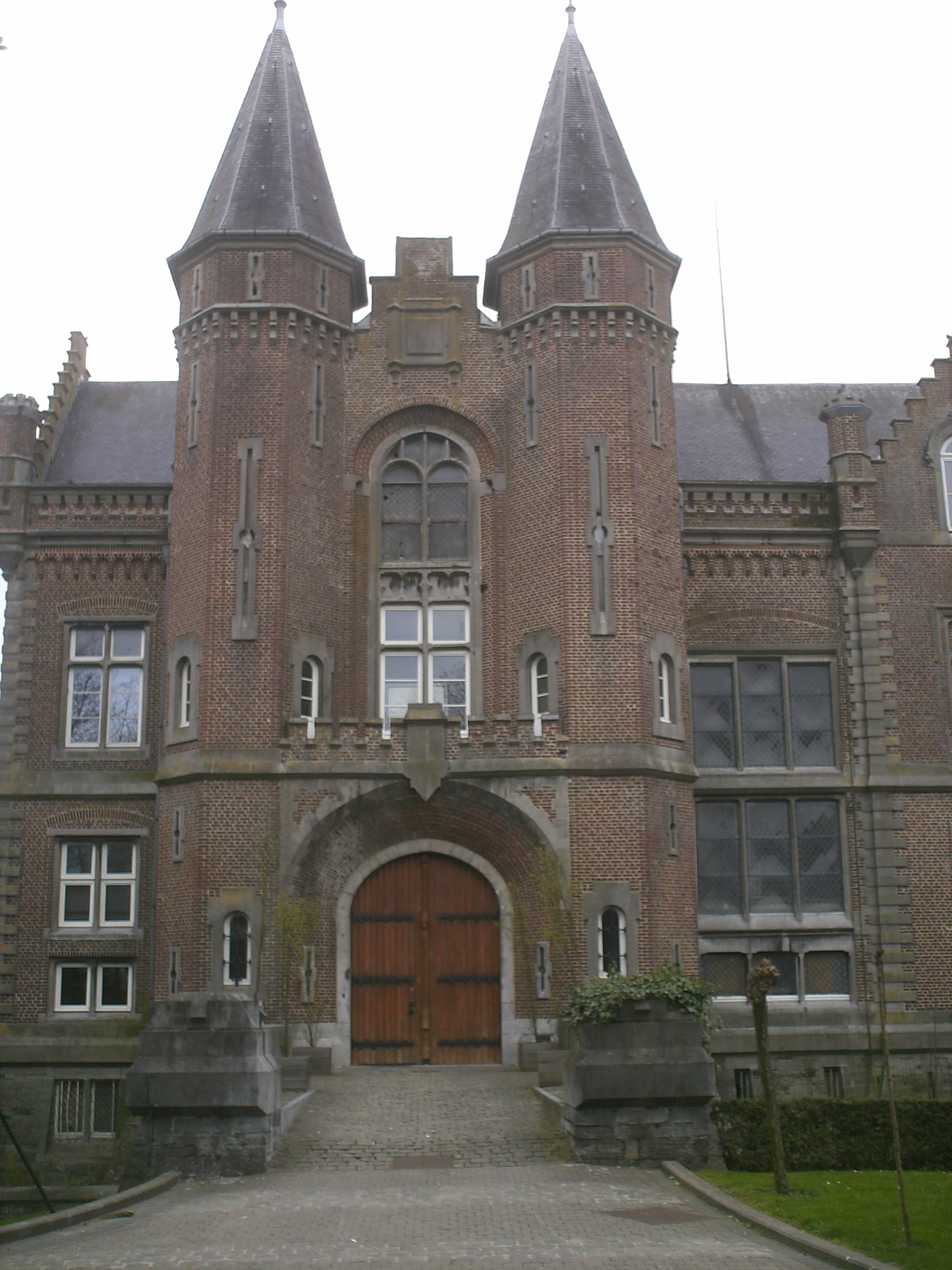
Main entrance of the Château de Bourgogne in Estaimbourg

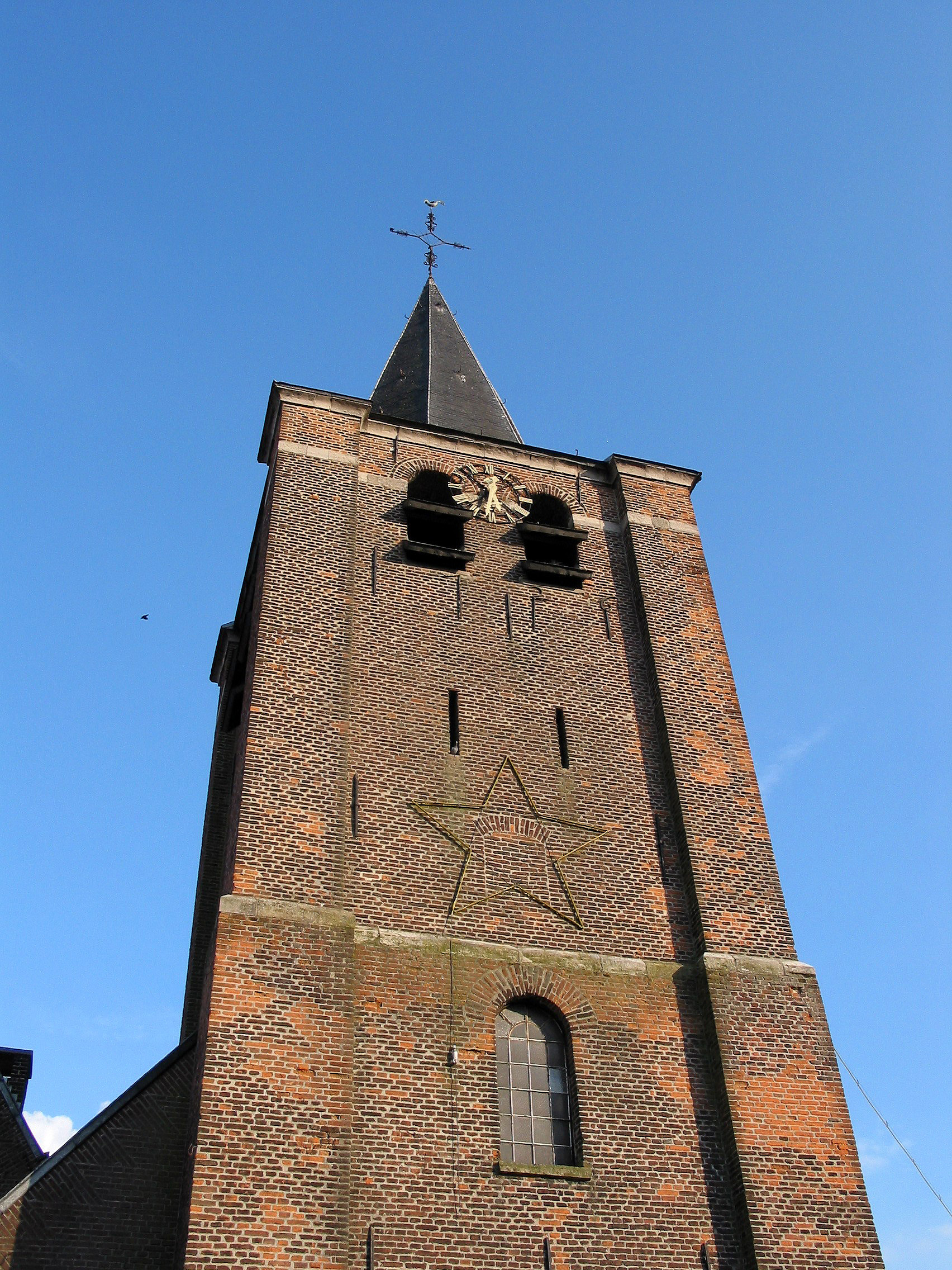
Churchtower (Saint Barthelemy church

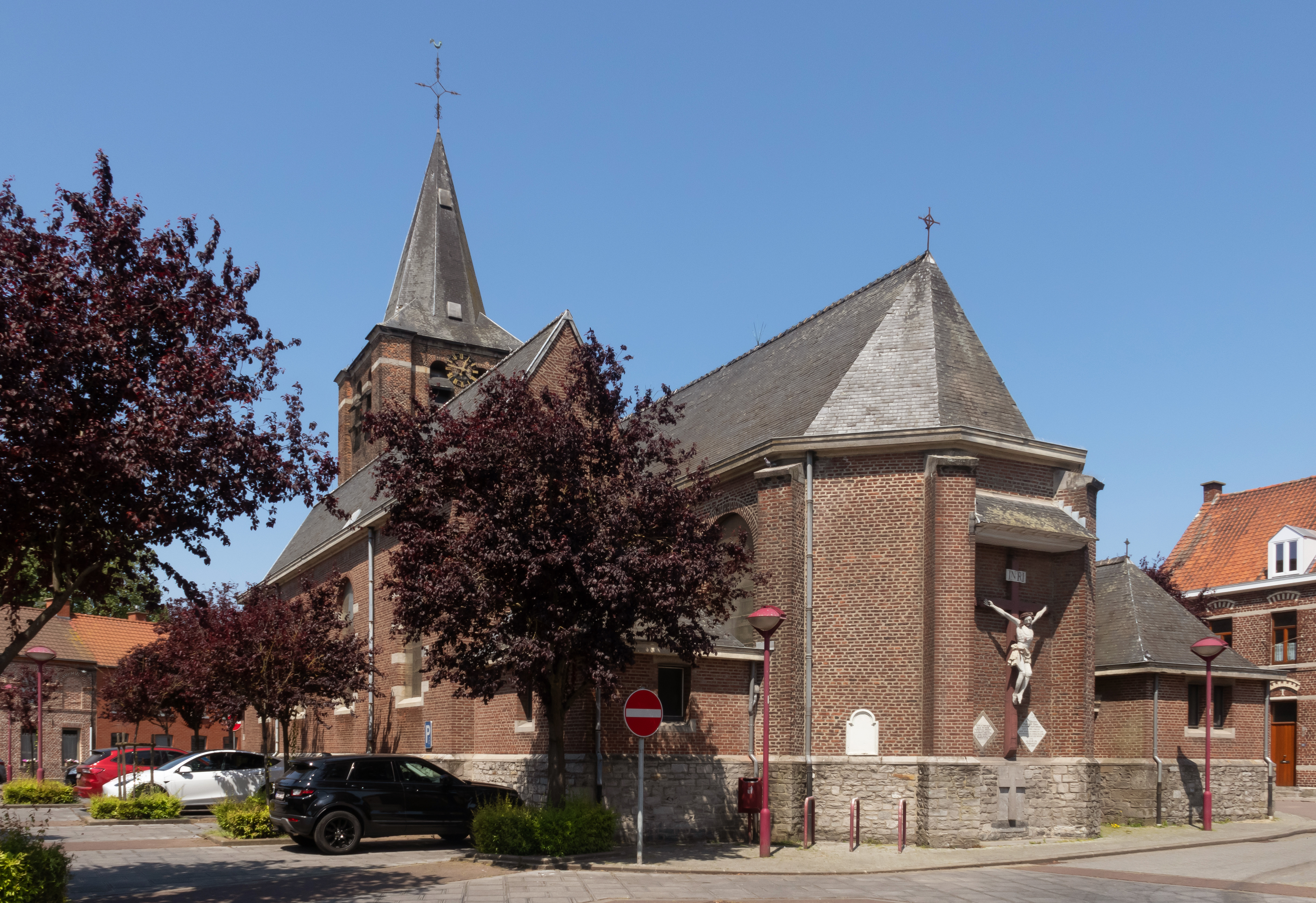
Church: l'église Saint-Barthélemy

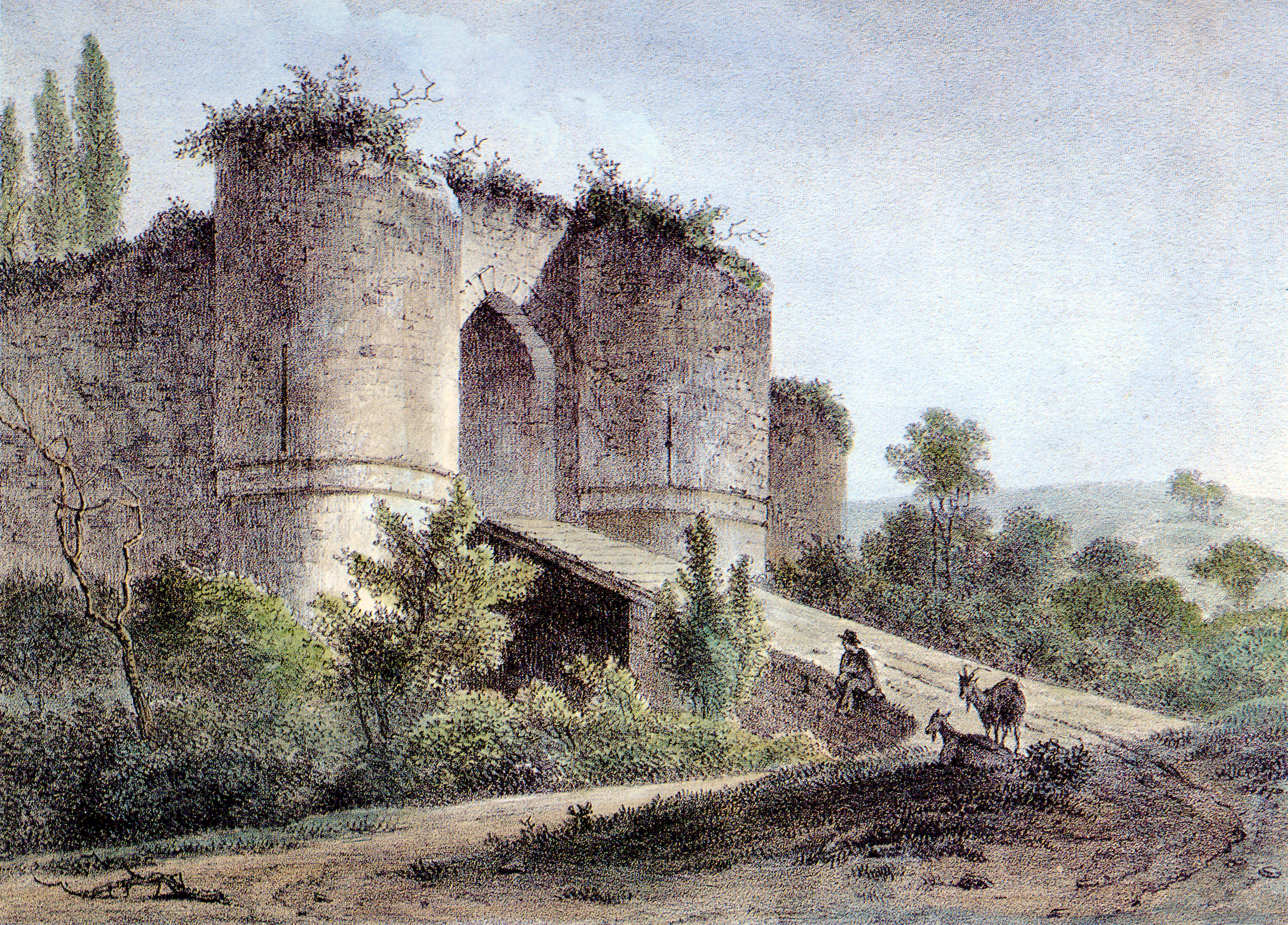
Château de la Royère, engraving ca. 1810 by J B de Jonghe
