= Whalton Manor =

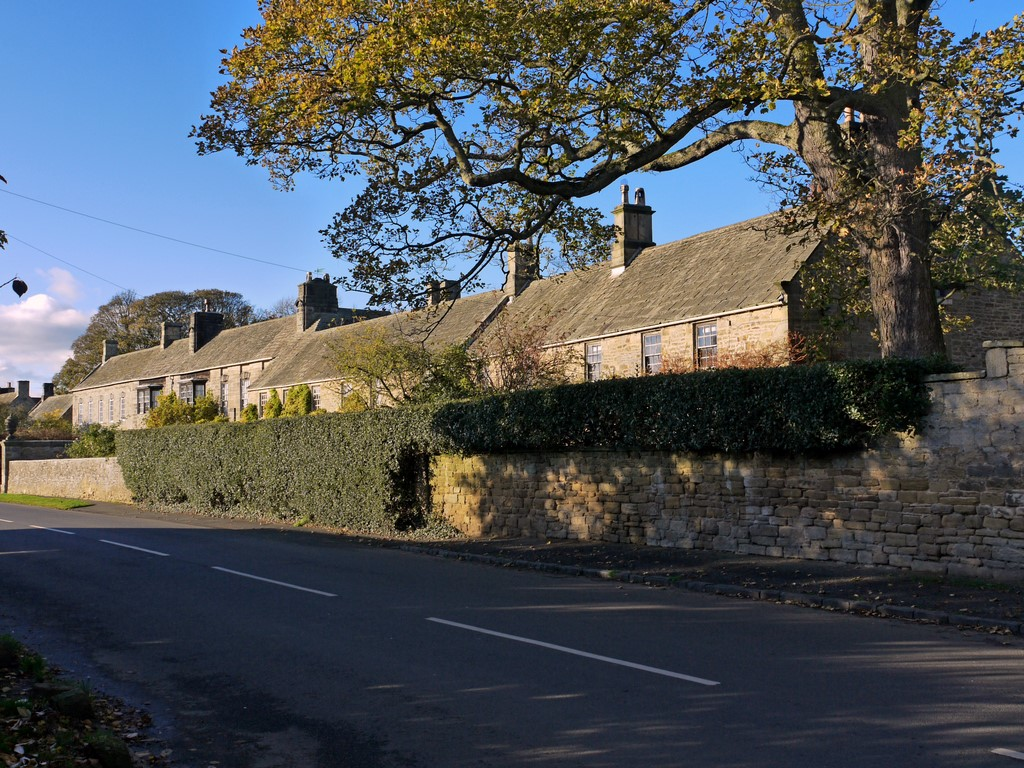
- Whalton Manor

- Location in Northumberland

General information
- Location: Northumberland, England, UK
- Coordinates: 55.127°N 1.793°W
- OS grid: NZ132814

Whalton Manor is a house in the village of Whalton, Northumberland, England. It is a grade II listed building. The house dates from the 17th century but was substantially altered by the architect Sir Edwin Lutyens in 1908, at the same time as he was working on Lindisfarne Castle on Holy Island.

With the help of Gertrude Jekyll, Lutyens also designed the walled gardens, which include architectural features such as a pavilion, a tiled hexagonal summerhouse, a stone pergola and a stone paved courtyard.
