= Whalton =

Village in Northumberland, England

Coordinates: 55.1276°N 1.7898°W

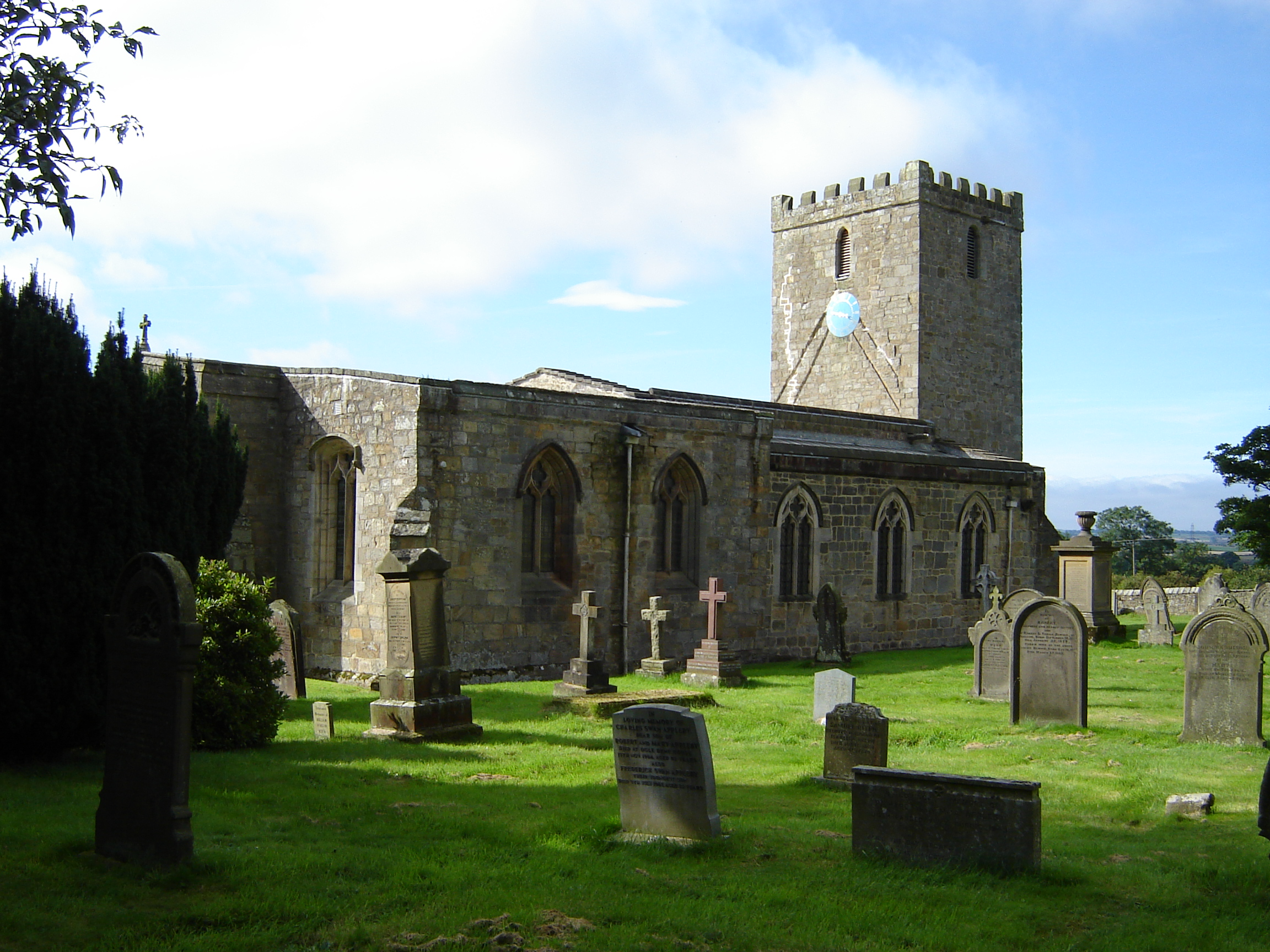
- St. Mary Magdalene

- Location within Northumberland
- Population: 427 (2001 census)
- OS grid reference: NZ129814
- Unitary authority: Northumberland
- Ceremonial county: Northumberland
- Region: North East
- Country: England
- Sovereign state: United Kingdom
- Post town: MORPETH
- Postcode district: NE61
- Police: Northumbria
- Fire: Northumberland
- Ambulance: North East
- UK Parliament: Hexham

Whalton is a small village in Northumberland, England. The population at the 2001 census was 427, which increased to 474 by the 2011 Census.

It hosts an annual Bale Fire on 4 July, the date on which midsummer's eve was celebrated before the introduction of the Gregorian calendar to England in 1752. It features morris dancing and dancing by the children of the village school outside of the Beresford Arms, which provides beer and a barbecue.

The annual village show takes place on the third Saturday in September, and generally includes sheep racing, classic cars, military vehicles, a birds-of-prey exhibit, archery, a brass band, a dog show, a farmers market, Northumbrian pipes music, a vegetable show, a flower show, teas and coffees, home baking, and a harvest festival at the church.

Whalton Manor is located at the heart of Whalton. Its garden is open to the public.
