= Esquelmes =

- Esquelmes, the medieval village church

- Location within Belgium Location within Europe
- Coordinates: 50°39′56″N 03°20′52″E
- Country: Belgium
- Region: Wallonia
- Province: Hainaut
- Municipality: Pecq

Esquelmes is a village and district of the municipality of Pecq, located in the Hainaut Province in Wallonia, Belgium.

Though mentioned in written sources as early as 1176, the village became its own parish only in 1802. The village church is medieval, its oldest parts dating from the 11th century and Romanesque in style. During both World War I and World War II, heavy fighting took place in and around Esquelmes. There is a British war cemetery in the village, containing the grave of among others George Percy, 9th Duke of Northumberland.
