= Pecq =

Municipality in Hainaut Province, Wallonia, Belgium

Pecq Pècq (Picard)
- Municipality
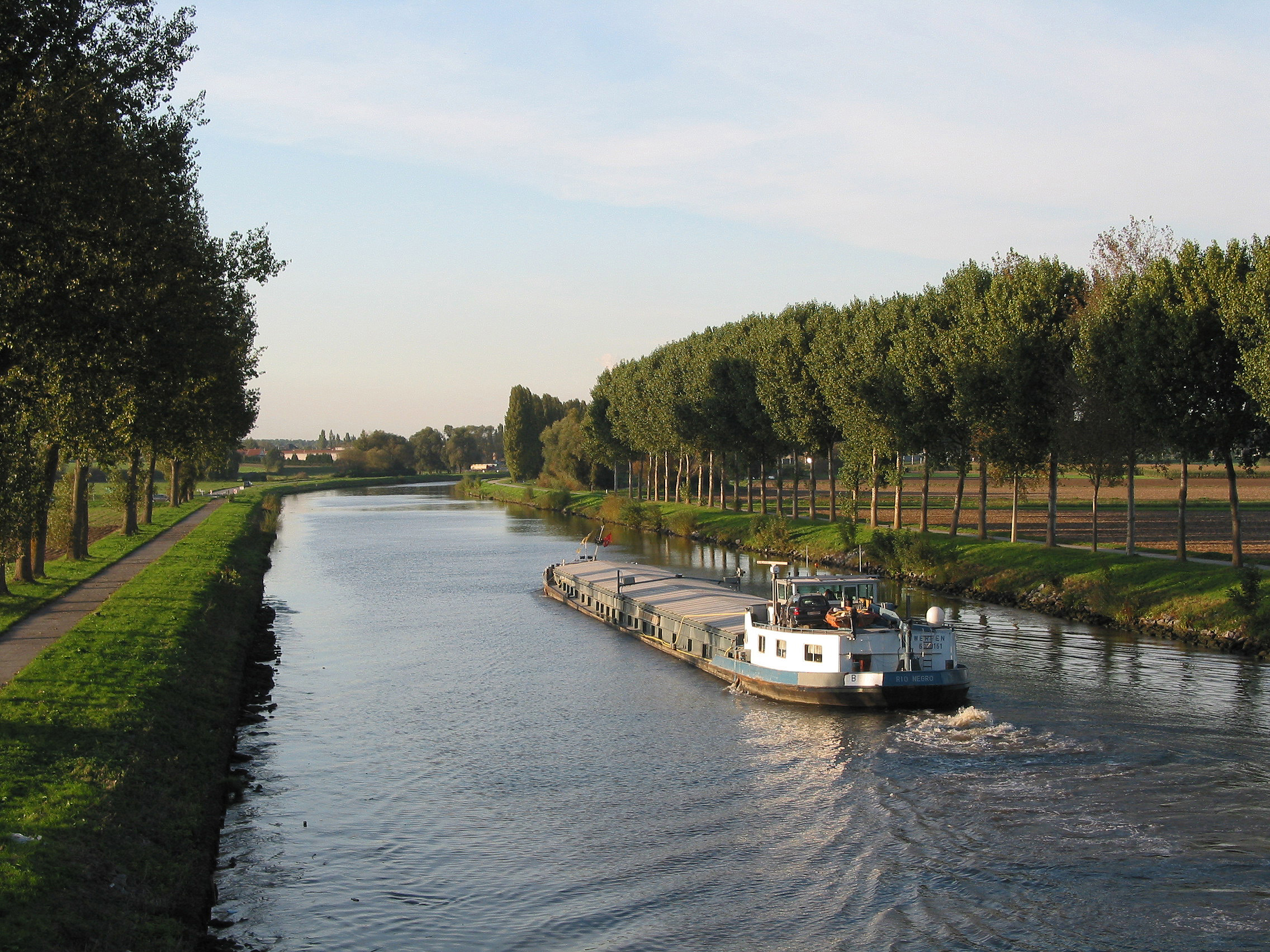

- Flag Coat of arms

- The Municipality in the province of Hainaut
- Interactive map of Pecq
- Location in Belgium
- Coordinates: 50°41′N 3°20′E
- Country: Belgium
- Community: French Community
- Region: Wallonia
- Province: Hainaut
- Arrondissement: Tournai-Mouscron

Government
  - Mayor: Aurélien Brabant (Ecolo)
  - Governing party: Community (ECOLO) - Actions (PS)

Area
  - Total: 33.15 km^{2} (12.80 sq mi)

Population (2026-01-01)
  - Total: 5,967
  - Density: 180.0/km^{2} (466.2/sq mi)
- Postal codes: 7740-7742-7743
- NIS code: 57062
- Area codes: 056 - 069
- Website: www.pecq.be

Pecq (French pronunciation: [pɛk]; Picard: Pècq; Walloon: Pêk) is a municipality of Wallonia located in the province of Hainaut, Belgium.

The municipality consists of the following districts: Esquelmes, Hérinnes, Obigies, Pecq, and Warcoing.

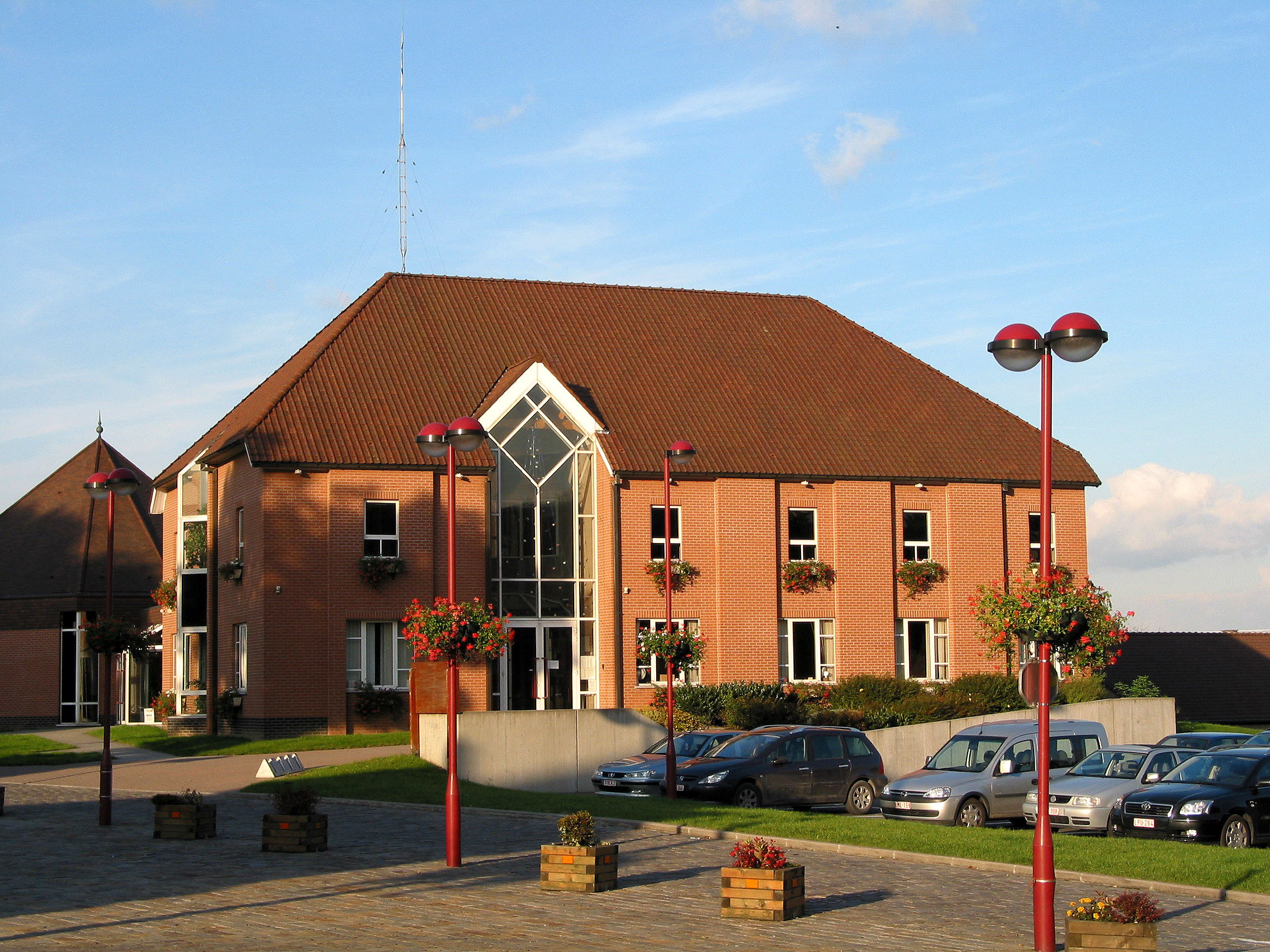
Pecq town hall
