= Pre-Romanesque art and architecture =

Art in Europe 6th-11th centuries

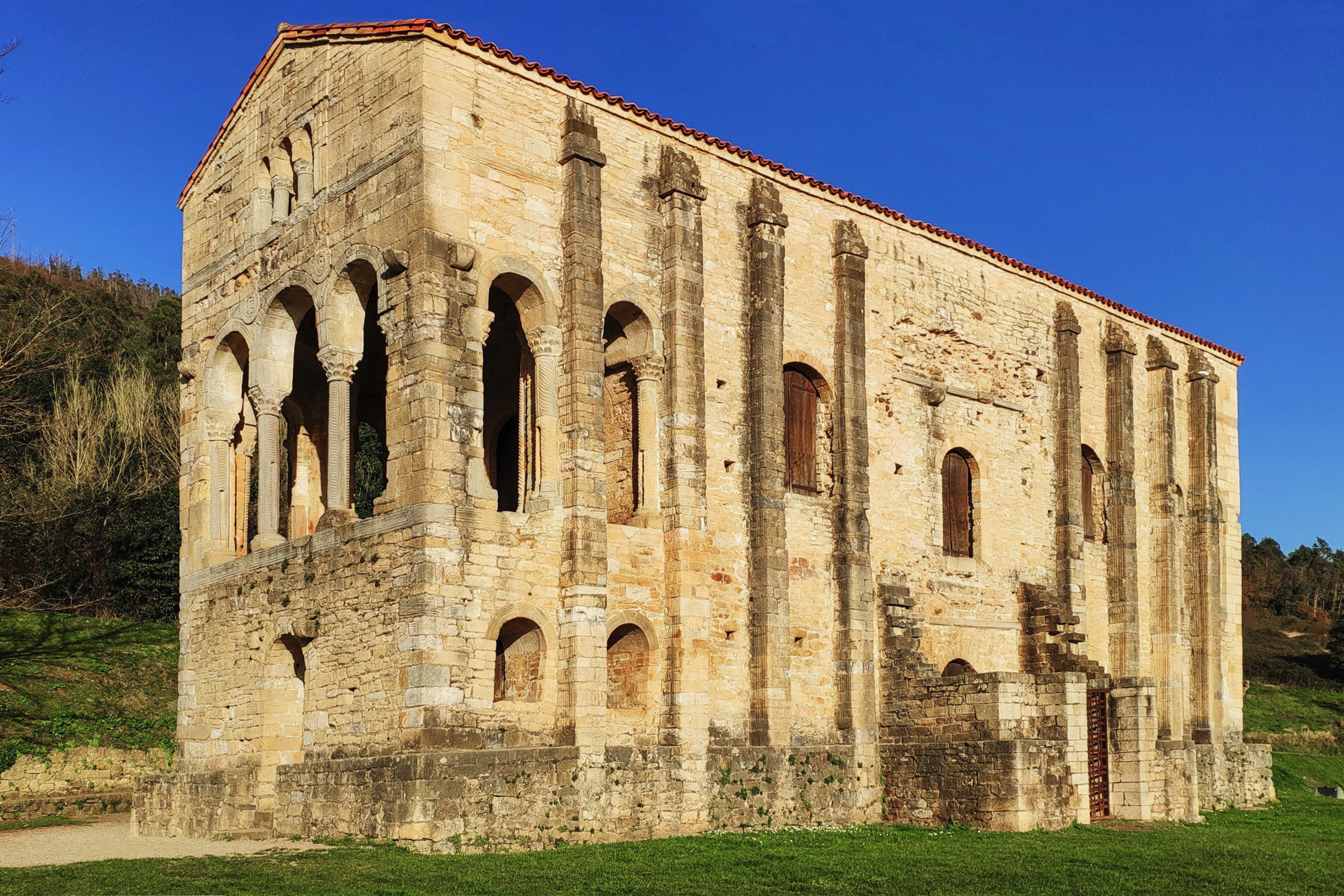
The royal palace, later church, of Santa María del Naranco, an example of Asturian architecture of the Ramirense period

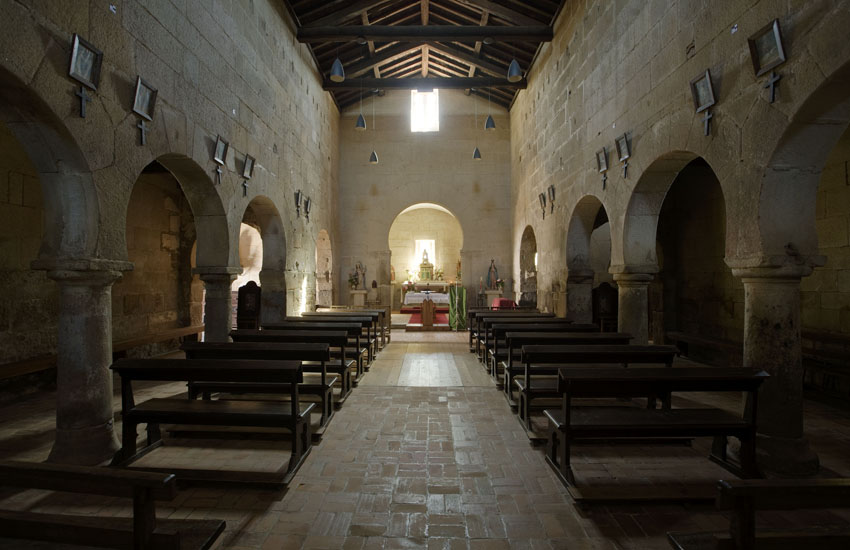
The interior of the Church of São Pedro da Lourosa in Lourosa, Portugal

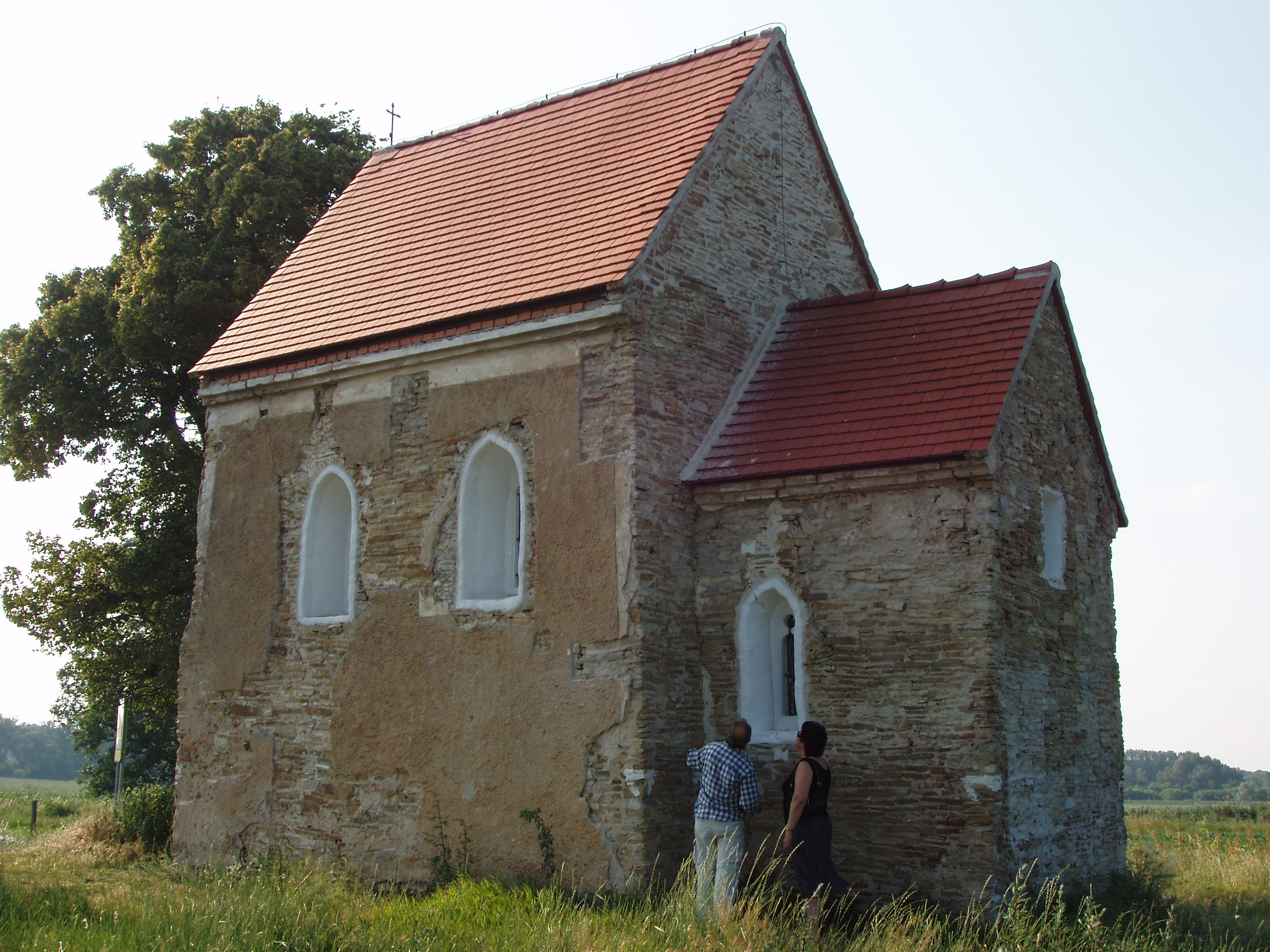
Church of St. Margaret of Antioch, Kopčany in Kopčany, Slovakia, 9th–10th centuries

In European art history, the pre-Romanesque period extends from either the rise of the Merovingian dynasty (c. 500) or the Carolingian Renaissance of the late 8th century to the onset of the Romanesque style in the 11th century. It often refers specifically to architecture and monumental sculpture, but this article covers all the arts of the period.

== History ==
The primary development during this period is the introduction and absorption of classical Mediterranean and Early Christian forms with Germanic ones, which gave rise to innovative new forms. This in turn led to the rise of Romanesque art in the 11th century. The pre-Romanesque was preceded by the Migration Period art of the barbarian peoples: Hiberno-Saxon in the British Isles and predominantly Merovingian in Continental Europe.

In most of Western Europe, Roman architectural tradition survived the collapse of the Roman empire. The Franks of the Merovingian polity continued to build large stone buildings like monastery churches and palaces.

The unification of the Frankish kingdom under Clovis I (r. 481–511) and his successors corresponds with a period of building churches, and especially monastery churches, as these were now the power-houses of the Merovingian church. Two hundred monasteries existed south of the Loire when St. Columbanus, an Irish missionary, arrived in Europe in 585. Only 100 years later, by the end of the 7th century, over 400 monasteries flourished in the Merovingian kingdom alone. The building plans often continued the Roman basilica tradition.

Many Merovingian plans have been reconstructed from archaeology. Bishop Gregory of Tours' History of the Franks says of the basilica of Saint-Martin, built at Tours by Saint Perpetuus (bishop 460–490) at the beginning of the period and at the time on the edge of Frankish territory churches that it had 120 marble columns, towers at the east end, and several mosaics: "Saint-Martin displayed the vertical emphasis, and the combination of block-units forming a complex internal space and the correspondingly rich external silhouette, which were to be the hallmarks of the Romanesque".

The Merovingian dynasty gave way to the Carolingian dynasty in 752 AD, which led to Carolingian architecture from 780 to 900, and to Ottonian architecture in East Francia (the Holy Roman Empire) from the mid-10th century until the mid-11th century. These successive Frankish dynasties were large contributors to Romanesque architecture.

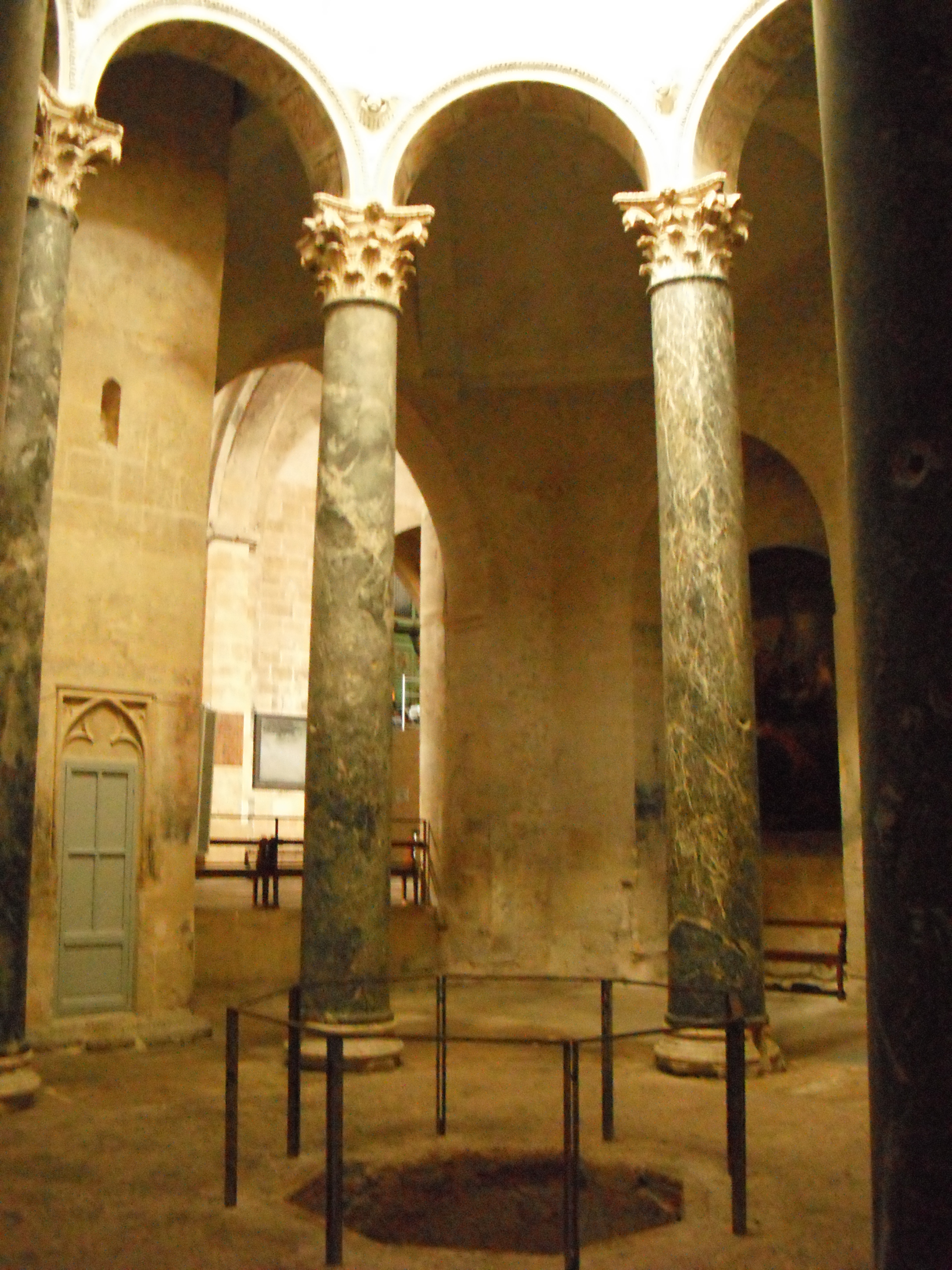
Baptistery of Aix Cathedral, built by the Merovingians, AD 500

== Examples of Frankish buildings ==
Merovingian, Carolingian and Ottonian

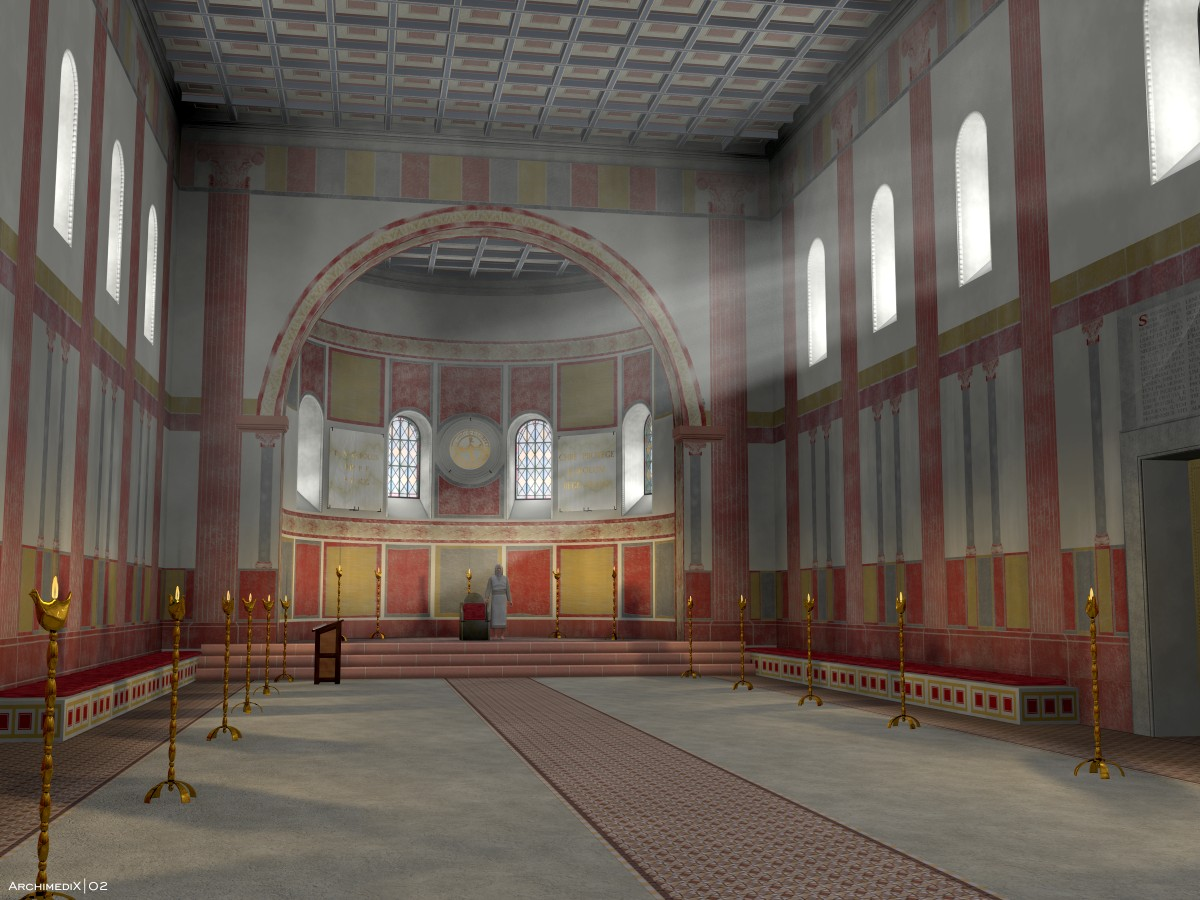
Digital reconstruction of Ingelheim Imperial Palace, c. 790

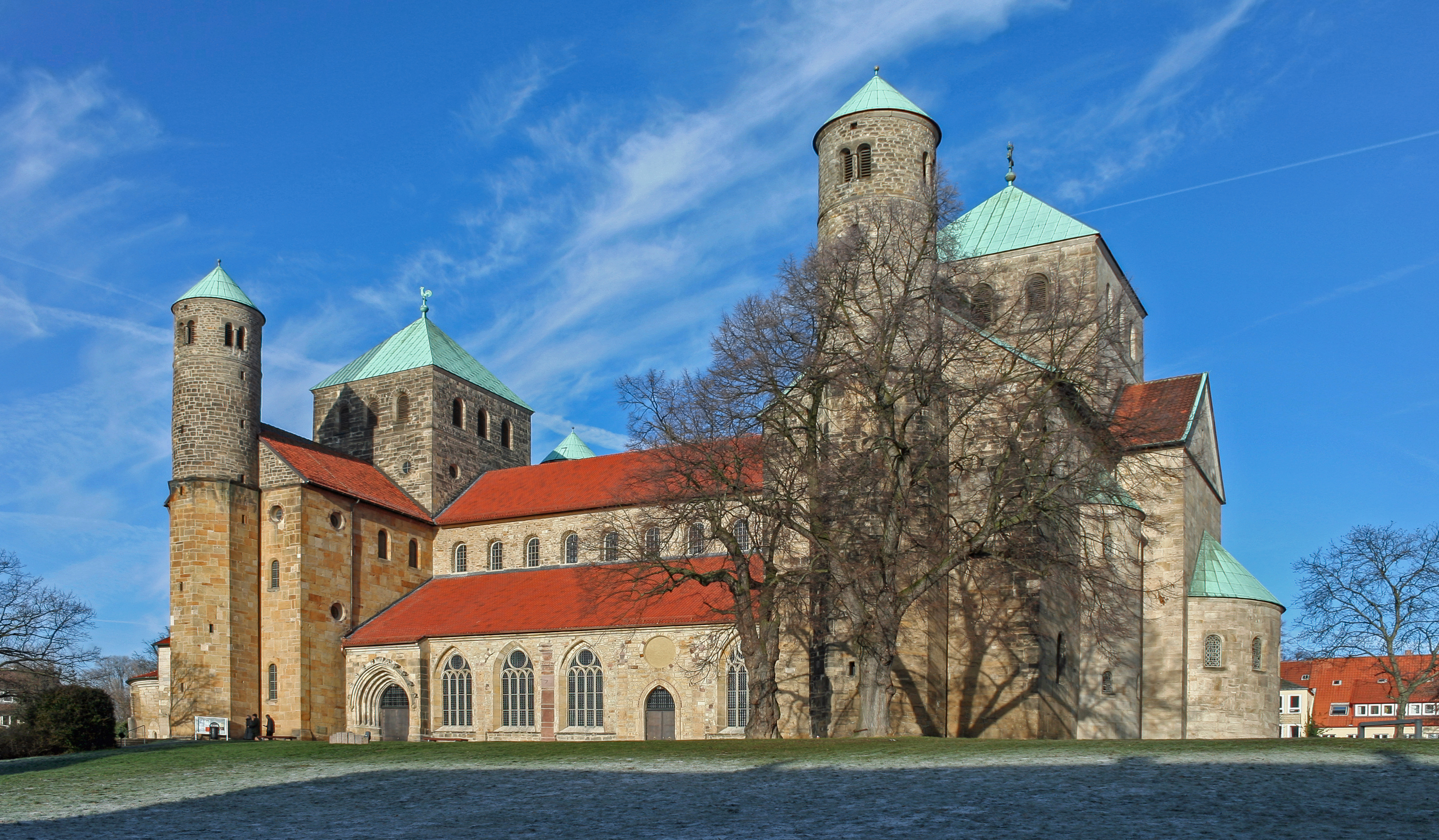
St. Michael's Church in Hildesheim, Germany, 1031

Reconstruction of Charlemagne's palace in Aachen, Germany, 800

- Baptistère de Riez built in the 4th, 5th and 7th centuries
- Fréjus Cathedral circa 450 AD
- Crypt of Saint-Laurent Grenoble circa 500
- Aix Cathedral circa 500, baptistery built by the Merovingians
- Baptistère Saint-Jean 507
- Baptistère de Venasque circa 500
- Abbey of Saint-Germain-des-Prés circa 540
- Radegonde de Poitiers Tomb of St. Radegunda 587
- Jouarre Abbey 630, Merovingian crypt
- Kloster Reichenau 724
- Benedictine Convent of Saint John, Müstair 780
- Granusturm 788, 20-meter-tall tower in Aarchen
- Lorsch Abbey, gateway, (c. 800)
- Palatine Chapel in Aachen (Aix-la-Chapelle) (792–805)
- Imperial Palace, Ingelheim 800
- Oratory of Bishop Theodulf of Orleans in Germigny-des-Prés 806
- St. Ursmar's Collegiate church, in Lobbes, Belgium (819–823)
- St. Michael, Fulda, rotunda and crypt (822)
- Einhard's Basilica, Steinbach (827)
- Saint Justinus' church, Frankfurt-Höchst (830)
- Hildesheim Cathedral, original build (872)
- Schloss Broich 883–884, Carolingian fortress
- Broich Castle, Muelheim on the Ruhr (884)
- Abbey of Corvey (885)
- St. George, Oberzell in Reichenau Island (888)
- St. Georg (Reichenau-Oberzell) 900
- St. Johannis (Mainz) 910
- Church of St Philibert, Tournus 950
- St. Cyriakus, Gernrode 969

Ottonian and Holy Roman Empire

- Mainz Cathedral begun 991 and 994 and retains some structure of this period.
- St. Michael's Church Hildesheim, 1031

== Imperial styles ==
=== Carolingian art ===
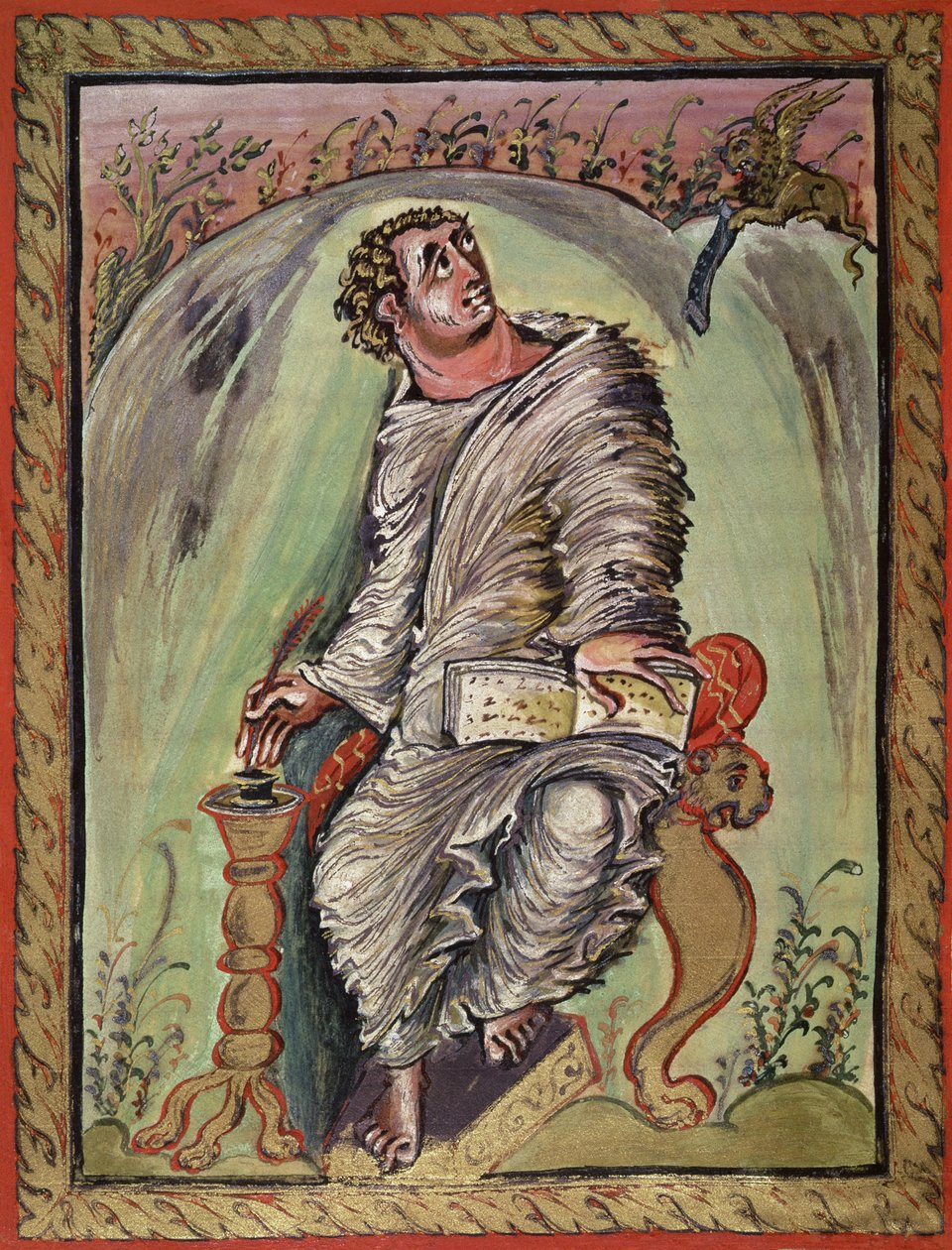
Saint Mark, from the so-called Ebbo Gospels, a piece of Carolingian illustration

Carolingian art is the roughly 120-year period from about 780 to 900, during Charlemagne's and his immediate heirs' rule, popularly known as the Carolingian Renaissance. Although brief, it was very influential; northern European kings promoted classical Mediterranean Roman art forms for the first time, while also creating innovative new forms such as naturalistic figure line drawings that would have lasting influence. Carolingian churches generally are basilican, like the Early Christian churches of Rome, and commonly incorporated westworks, which is arguably the precedent for the western facades of later medieval cathedrals. An original westwork survives today at the Abbey of Corvey, built in 885. After a rather chaotic interval following the Carolingian period, the new Ottonian dynasty revived Imperial art from about 950, building on and further developing Carolingian style in Ottonian art.

=== Ottonian art ===
Germanic pre-Romanesque art during the 120-year period from 936 to 1056 is commonly called Ottonian art after the three Saxon emperors named Otto (Otto I, Otto II, and Otto III) who ruled the Holy Roman Empire from 936 to 1001.

After the decline of the Carolingian Empire, the Holy Roman Empire was re-established under the Saxon (Ottonian) dynasty. From this emerged a renewed faith in the idea of Empire and a reformed Church, creating a period of heightened cultural and artistic fervour. It was in this atmosphere that masterpieces were created that fused the traditions from which Ottonian artists derived their inspiration: models of Late Antique, Carolingian, and Byzantine origin.

Much Ottonian art reflected the dynasty's desire to establish visually a link to the Christian rulers of Late Antiquity, such as Constantine, Theoderich, and Justinian as well as to their Carolingian predecessors, particularly Charlemagne.

Ottonian monasteries produced some of the most magnificent medieval illuminated manuscripts. They were a major art form of the time, and monasteries received direct sponsorship from emperors and bishops, having the best in equipment and talent available.

== Regional styles ==
=== British Isles ===
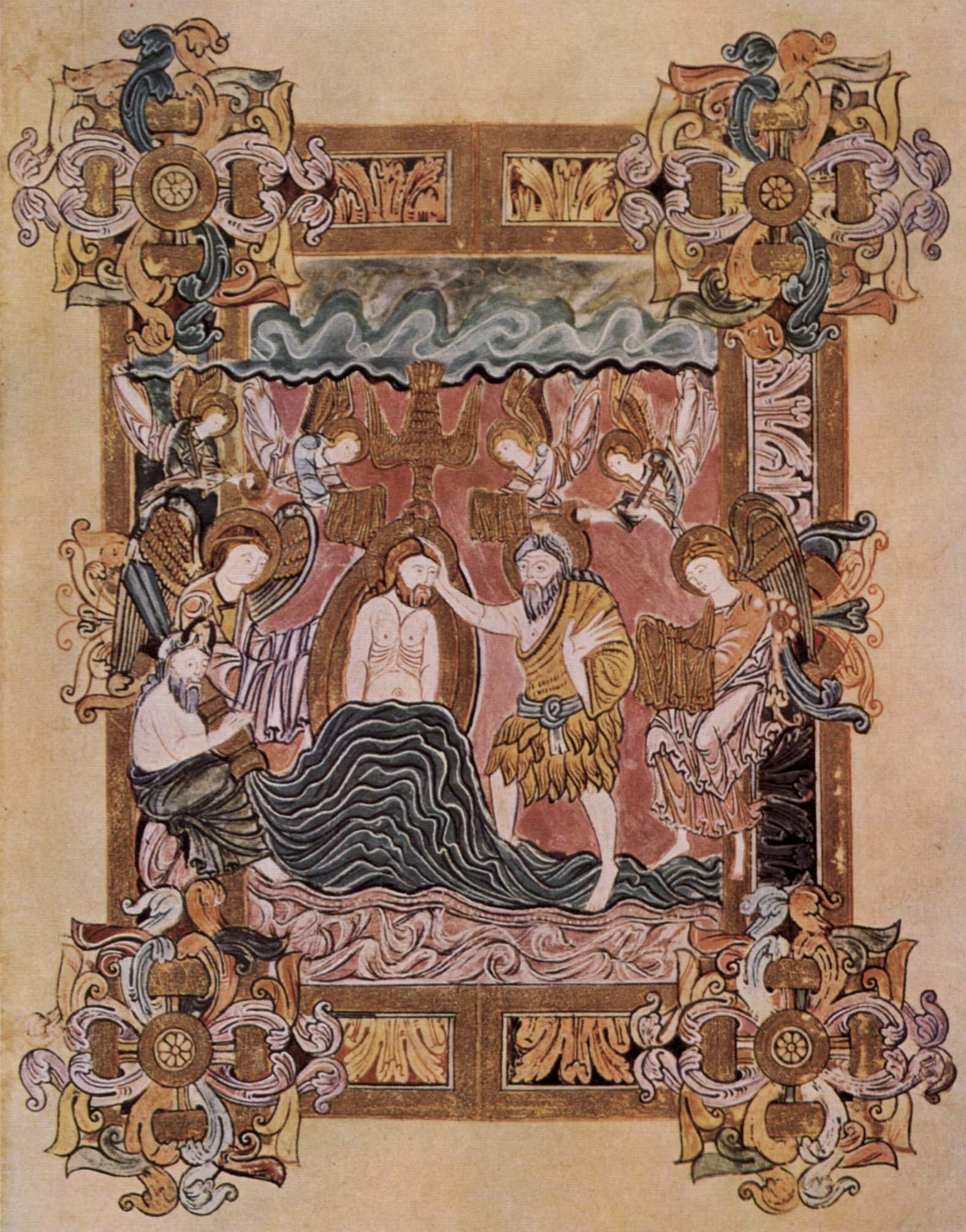
The Benedictional of Saint Æthelwold, an illuminated manuscript

Prior to King Alfred the dominant art style in England was the Hiberno-Saxon culture, producing in Insular art the fusion of Anglo-Saxon and Celtic techniques and motifs, which had largely ceased in Ireland and Northern England with the Viking invasions. The period from the time of King Alfred (885) is known as the Anglo-Saxon period proper, with the revival of English culture after the end of the Viking raids, to the early 12th century, when Romanesque art became the new movement. Anglo-Saxon art is mainly known today through illuminated manuscripts and metalwork.

=== Croatia ===
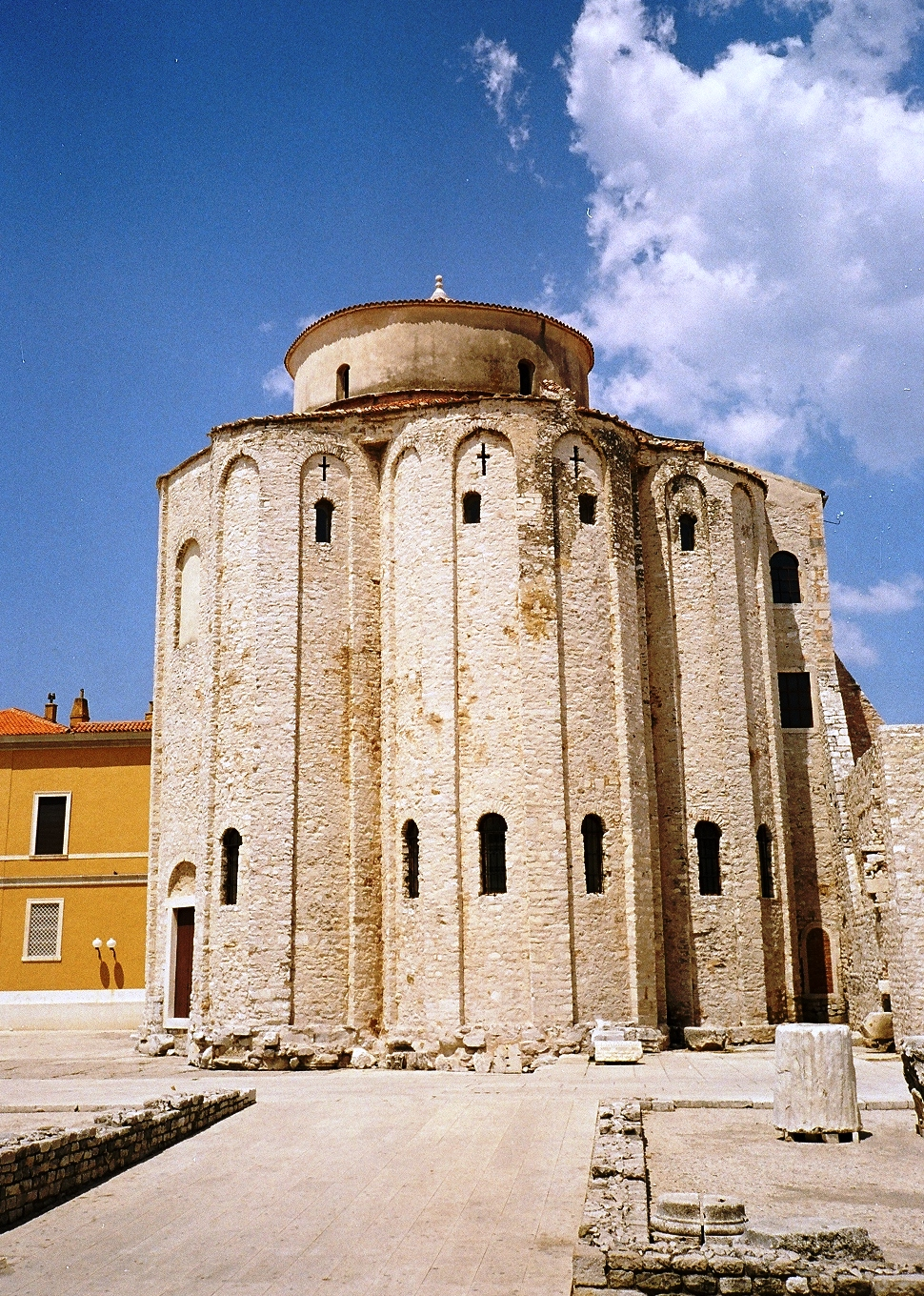
Church of St Donatus in Zadar, Croatia, 9th century.

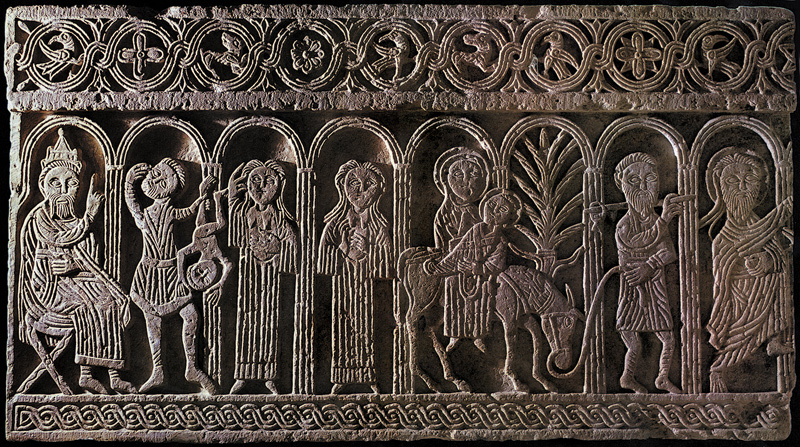
Monumental pluteus (98 x 183) from the church of St. Nediljica, Zadar, mid-11th century, showing "Massacre of the Innocents", "Flight into Egypt", "Baptism".

In the 7th century the Croats, with other Slavs and Avars, came from Eastern Europe to the region where they live today. The first Croatian churches were built as royal sanctuaries, and the influence of Roman art was strongest in Dalmatia where urbanization was thickest. Gradually that influence was neglected and certain simplifications and alterations of inherited forms, and even creation of original buildings, appeared.

All of them (a dozen large ones and hundreds of small ones) were built in various type forms, with roughly cut stone bounded with a thick layer of mortar on the outside. Large churches are longitudinal with one or three naves like Church of Holy Salvation (Croatian: Crkva Sv. Spasa) at the spring of the river Cetina, built in the 9th century, along with the Church of the Holy Cross, Nin in Nin. The largest and most complicated central based church from the 9th century is dedicated to Saint Donatus in Zadar.

Altar rails and windows of those churches were highly decorated with transparent shallow string-like ornament that is called pleter (meaning to weed) because the strings were threaded and rethreaded through itself. Motifs of those reliefs were taken from Roman art; sometimes figures from the Bible appeared alongside this decoration, like pluteus relief in Holy Nedjeljica in Zadar, and then they were subdued by their pattern. This also happened to engravings in early Croatian script – Glagolitic. Soon, the Glagolitic writings were replaced with Latin on altar rails and architraves of old-Croatian churches. From the Crown Church of King Zvonimir (so called Hollow Church in Solin) comes the altar board with figure of Croatian King on the throne with Carolingian crown, servant by his side and subject bowed to the king.

By joining the Hungarian crown in the twelfth century, Croatia lost its full independence, but it did not lose its ties with the south and the west, and instead this ensured the beginning of a new era of Central European cultural influence.

=== France ===
After the demise of the Carolingian Empire, France split into a number of feuding provinces, so that lacking any organized Imperial patronage, French art of the 10th and 11th centuries became localised around the large monasteries, and lacked the sophistication of a court-directed style.

Multiple regional styles developed based on the chance availability of Carolingian manuscripts (as models to draw from), and the availability of itinerant artists. The monastery of Saint Bertin became an important centre under its abbot Odbert (986–1007) who created a new style based on Anglo-Saxon and Carolingian forms. The nearby abbey of Saint Vaast created a number of works. In southwestern France at the monastery of Saint Martial in Limoges a number of manuscripts were produced around year 1000, as were produced in Albi, Figeac and Saint-Sever-de-Rustan in Gascony. In Paris there developed a style at the abbey of Saint Germain-des-Prés. In Normandy a new style developed from 975 onward.

=== Italy ===
Southern Italy benefited from the presence and cross-fertilization of the Byzantines, the Arabs, and the Normans, while the north was mostly controlled first by the Carolingians. The Normans in Sicily chose to commission Byzantine workshops to decorate their churches such as Monreale and Cefalù Cathedrals where full iconographic programmes of mosaics have survived. Important frescos and illuminated manuscripts were produced.

=== Spain and Portugal ===
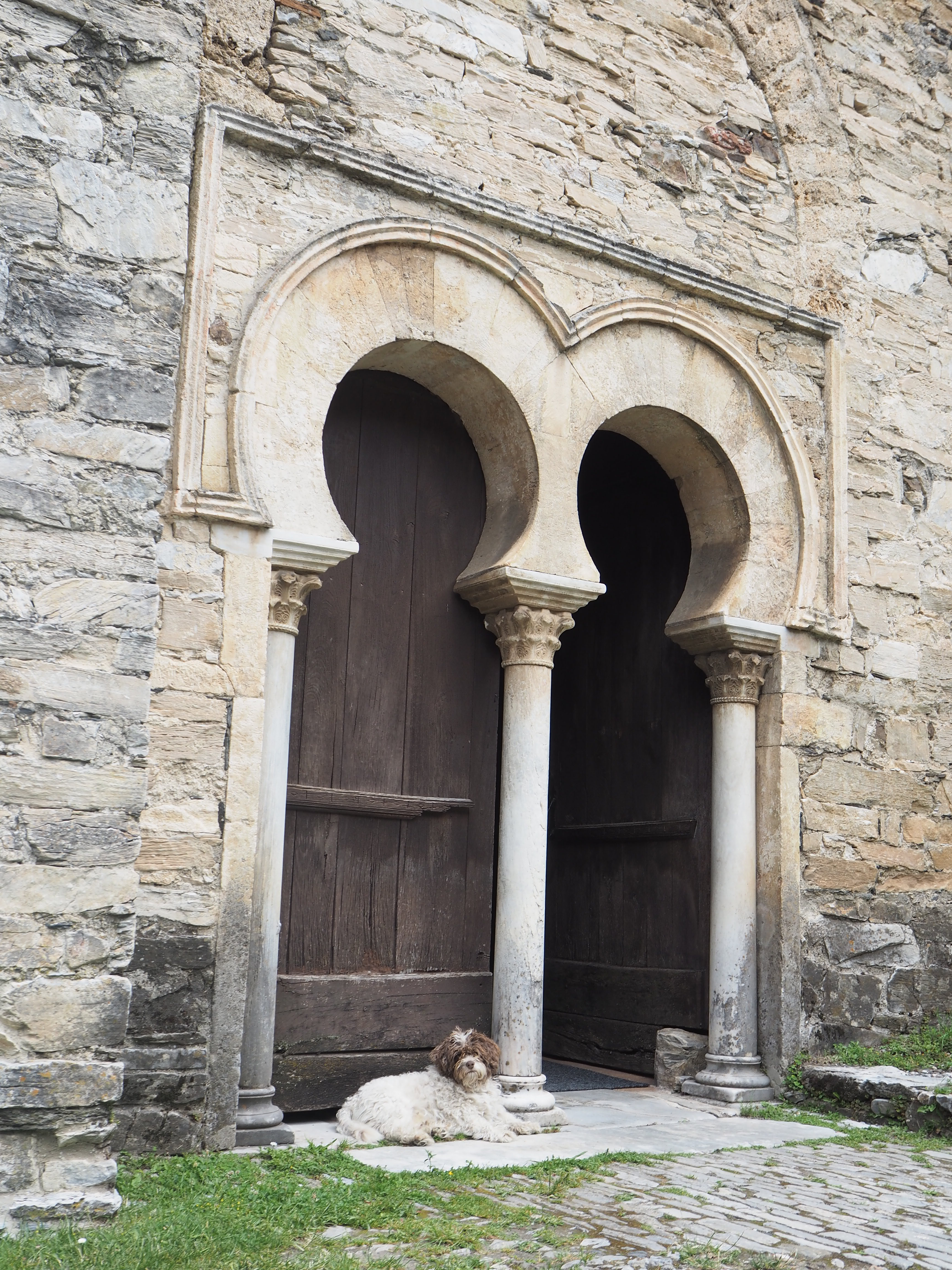
Santiago de Peñalba, an example of mozarabic iberian art

The first form of Pre-Romanesque in Spain and Portugal was the Visigothic art, that brought the horse-shoe arches to the latter Moorish architecture and developed jewelry.

After the Moorish occupation, Pre-Romanesque art was first reduced to the Kingdom of Asturias, the only Christian realm in the area at the time which reached high levels of artistic depuration. (See Asturian art). The Christians who lived in Moorish territory, the Mozarabs, created their own architectural and illumination style, Mozarabic art.

The best preserved Visigothic monument in Portugal is the Saint Frutuoso Chapel in Braga.

== See also ==
- Asturian architecture
