= Theodwin =

Theodwin, also known in the forms Dietwin and Theoduinus, is a name. It might refer to:

- Theodwin of Lobbes, an 8th-century abbot
- Theodwin of Liège, an 11th-century bishop
- Theodwin of Santa Rufina, a 12th-century cardinal
