= Collegiate Church of Saint Ursmer =

Collegiate church in Lobbes, Belgium

Coordinates: 50°20′47″N 4°15′57″E

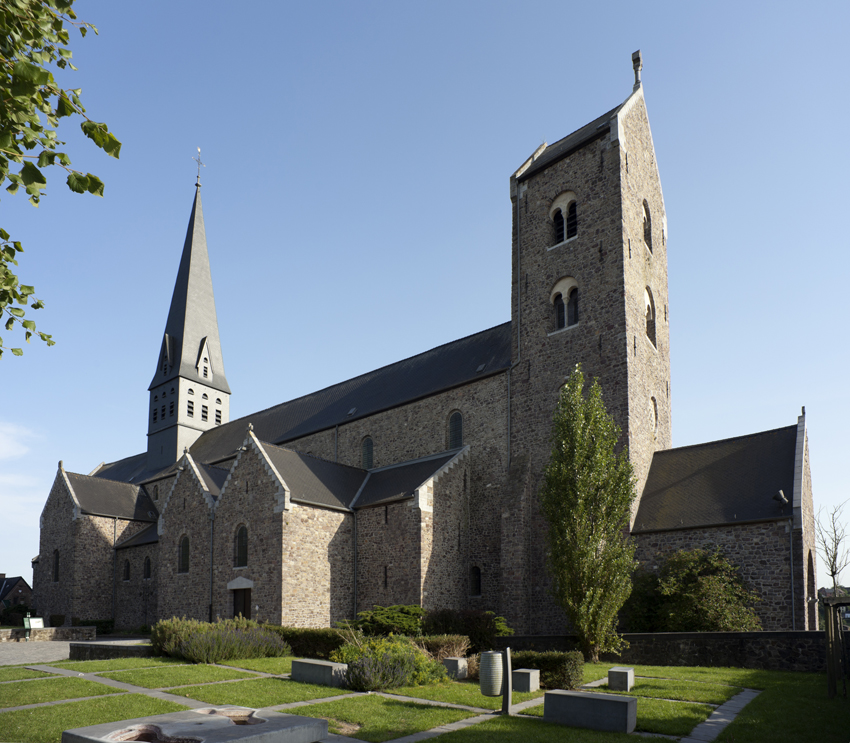
Collegiate Church of Saint Ursmer, view from the north-west

The Collegiate Church of Saint Ursmer (French: Collégiale Saint-Ursmer) is a church in Lobbes, a town of Wallonia located in the province of Hainaut, Belgium. Originally built as a burial church for monks and abbots of nearby Lobbes Abbey, it developed into a pilgrimage church after Saint Ursmer was interred there. Around 823 a new, much larger church was built, the presently visible church building, Carolingian in style. It is the only Carolingian church building still relatively intact in Belgium, and also the oldest church building still in use in Belgium. The church was partially rebuilt and extended in the late 12th and early 13th century, in a Romanesque style. In 1865, the church underwent an far-reaching and intrusive renovation.

== History ==
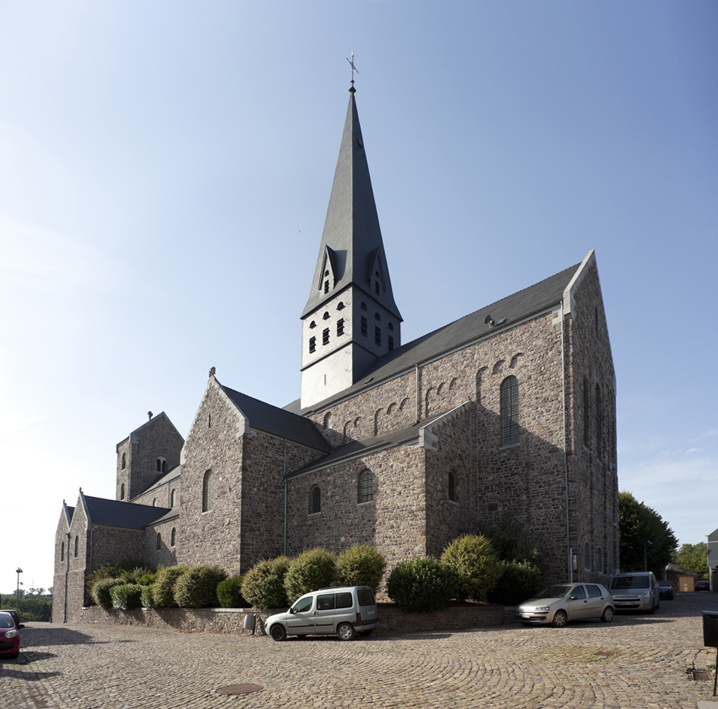
View of the church from the south-east

A small church was originally built on the location of the presently visible church in the 7th century. It served as a burial church for the monks and abbots of nearby Lobbes Abbey, who were not buried within the abbey out of reverence for the alleged relics of Saint Peter that were kept there. This first burial church was considerably smaller, and dedicated to Saint Mary. Following the death and burial in the church of Ursmer (or Ursmar), the erstwhile abbot of Lobbes Abbey who was proclaimed a saint, the church became a popular pilgrimage site. The pilgrims brough an influx of money, and as the old church quickly became too small, a new church was built on a considerably grander scale around 823.

The new church, dedicated to Saint Ursmer, also became the parish church of the town of Lobbes and was built in the tradition of the great abbey churches of Corbie, Saint-Riquier and Corvey. This Carolingian church forms the core of the presently visible church building. It is the only Carolingian church building still relatively intact in Belgium, and also the oldest church building still in use in Belgium.

During the late 12th and early 13th centuries, the church was partially rebuilt and extended. The present chancel, crypt, and tower with adjoining porch date from this period, and are Romanesque in style. In 1865, the church underwent an far-reaching and intrusive renovation. A spire was added over the eastern crossing and a new gable roof was installed. The inside was also extensively altered, with the rhythm of the bays changed and some capitals replaced. Most furnishings were also replaced with Neo-Romanesque furnishnings.

== Description ==
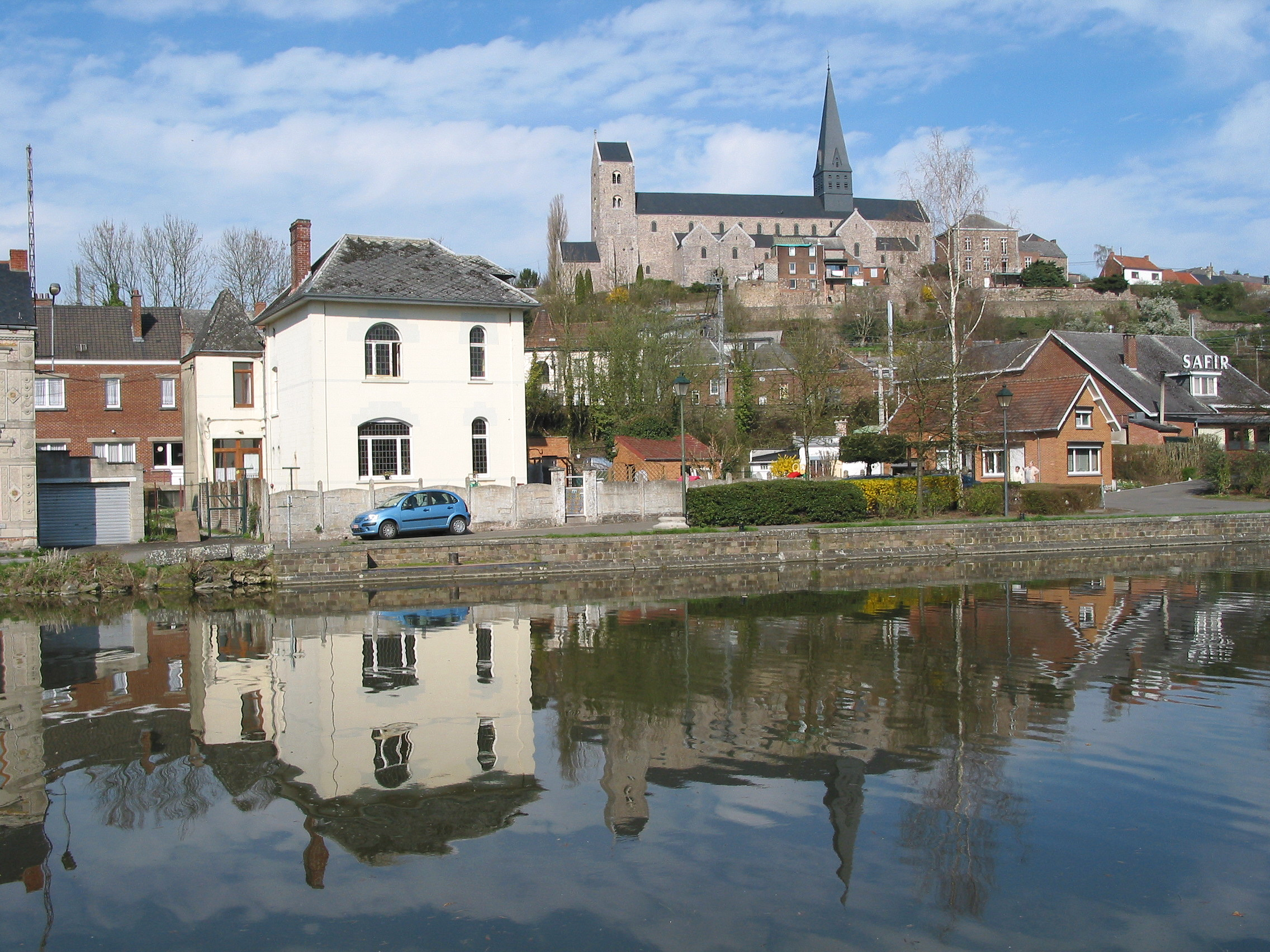
View of the church from the banks of the Sambre

The church lies on a small plateau overlooking the Sambre and the town of Lobbes. It is built of ferruginous sandstone rubble. It almost lacks exterior decoration, only the chancel is decorated with Lombard bands and lesenes. The western part of the church, with the entrance, was originally a more developed westwork. Today, it forms what is in appearance a western transept with a large gallery, anteceded by a tower and church porch. The nave is three bays long, followed by a transept and a square apse. The original floor plan is similar to that of the Abbey of Saint-Riquier in northern France. The Romanesque crypt, containing a well, is located beneath the apse.
