= Ermin of Lobbes =

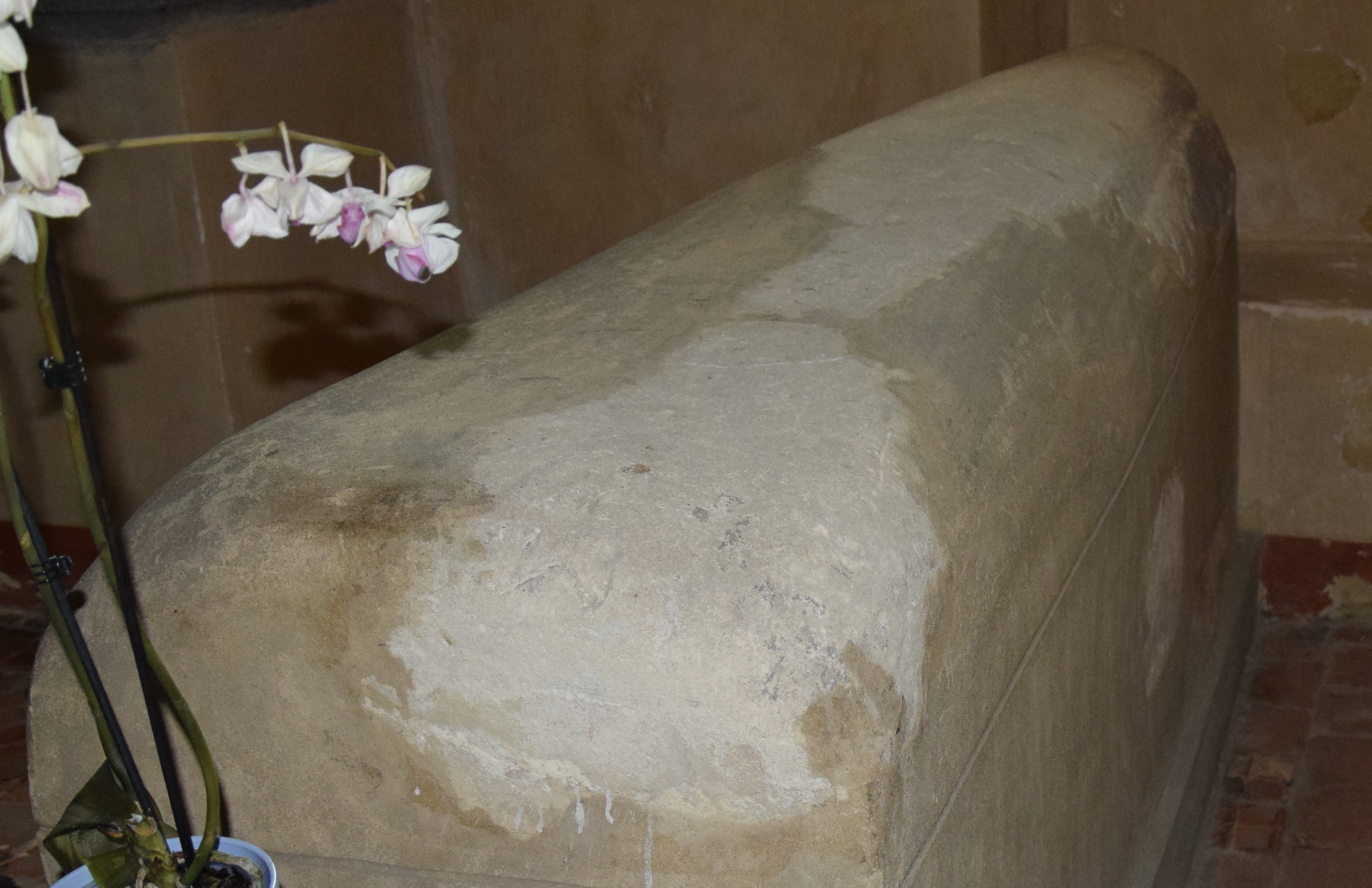
Sarcophagus of Saint Ermin in the parish church of Lobbes

Saint Ermin of Lobbes (died 737, in Lobbes, Hainaut, Belgium) was the second abbot of Lobbes Abbey.

== Life and legend ==
Originally from the region of Laon, he studied at the Cathedral School of Laon (France) and was ordained as a priest by the bishop, Madalgaire.

After entering the Benedictine monastery of Lobbes, he became a disciple of Saint Ursmar. After nomination by Ursmar, he was elected as his successor as the head of the abbey, founded by Saint Landelin. He had a reputation for wisdom and sanctity. His biographer, abbot Anson of Lobbes (+800), stated that he also had a gift for prophecy.

He died in Lobbes in 737, and is interred in a sarcophagus in the crypt of Saint Ursmar's Church in Lobbes. He was succeeded as abbot by Theodwin.

== Feast day ==
Saint Ermin (Latin: Erminus) is celebrated locally as a Christian saint. His feast day is on 25 April.

== Bibliography ==
- A Vita Ermini was written by Abbot Anson of Lobbes between 750 and 768. This biography was published in the Acta Sanctorum by the Bollandists (April, vol. III).
