= Mont-Sainte-Geneviève =

Coordinates: 50.372347°N 4.236503°E

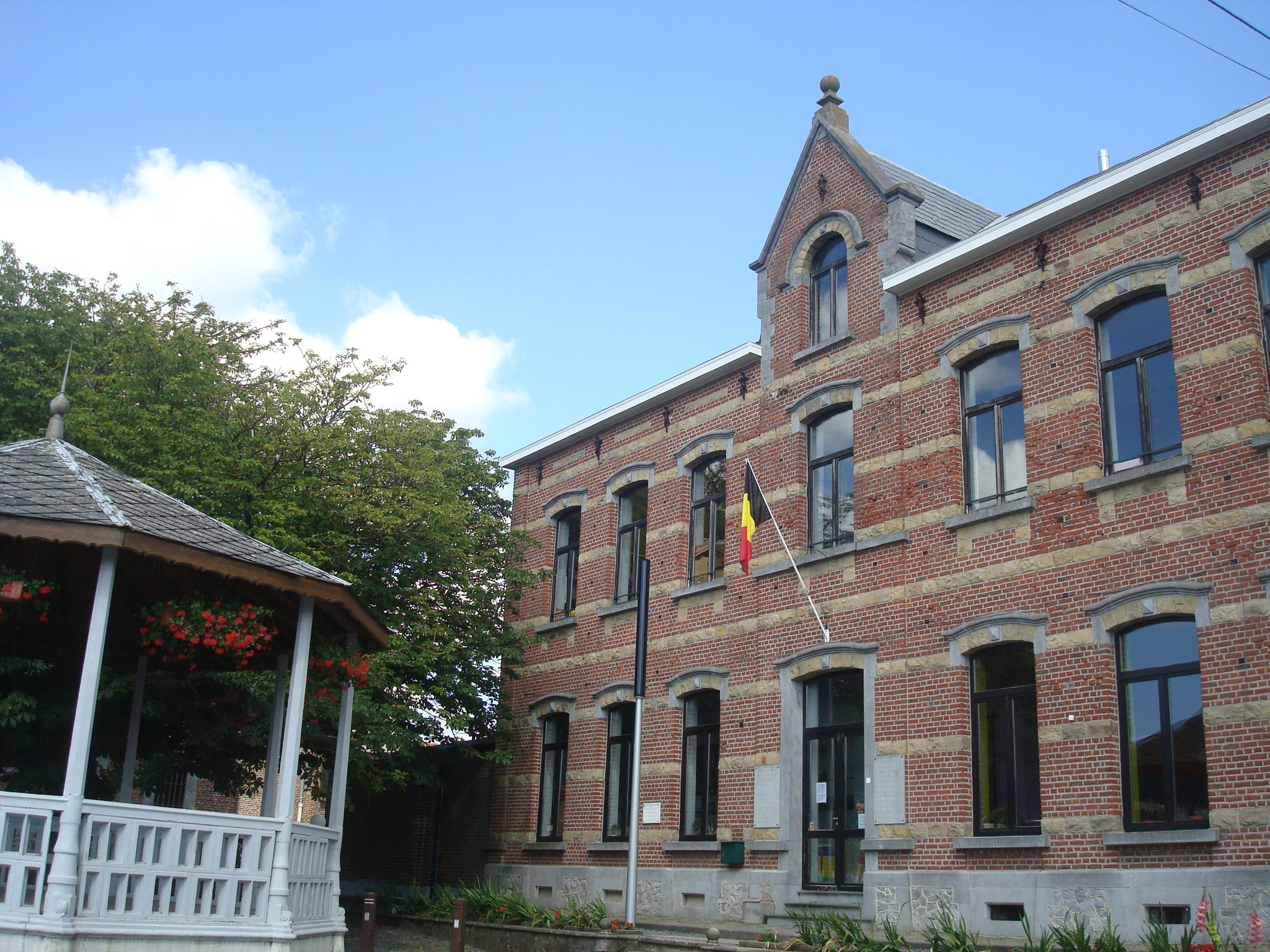
Mont-Sainte-Geneviève School.

Mont-Sainte-Geneviève (French pronunciation: [mɔ̃ sɛ̃t ʒənvjɛv]; Walloon: Mont-Sinte-Djenvire) is a village of Wallonia and a district in the municipality of Lobbes, located in the province of Hainaut, Belgium.
