= Bienne-lez-Happart =

Section of Lobbes, Belgium

Coordinates: 50.3518°N 4.214777°E

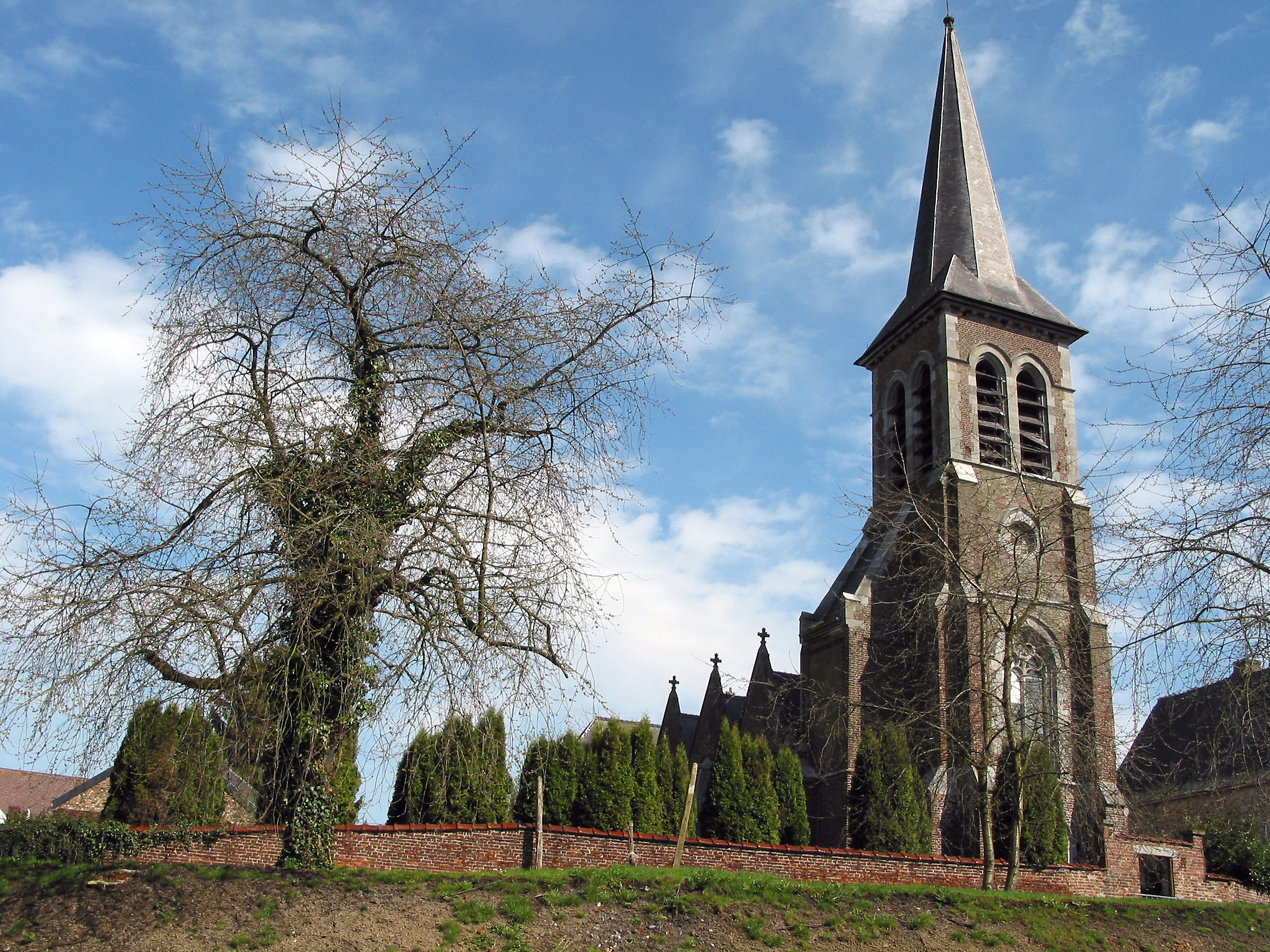
The Church of Saint Remy.

Bienne-lez-Happart (Walloon: Biene) is a village of Wallonia and a district in the municipality of Lobbes, located in the province of Hainaut, Belgium.
