= Carolingian architecture =

Architectural period of the Carolingian Empire

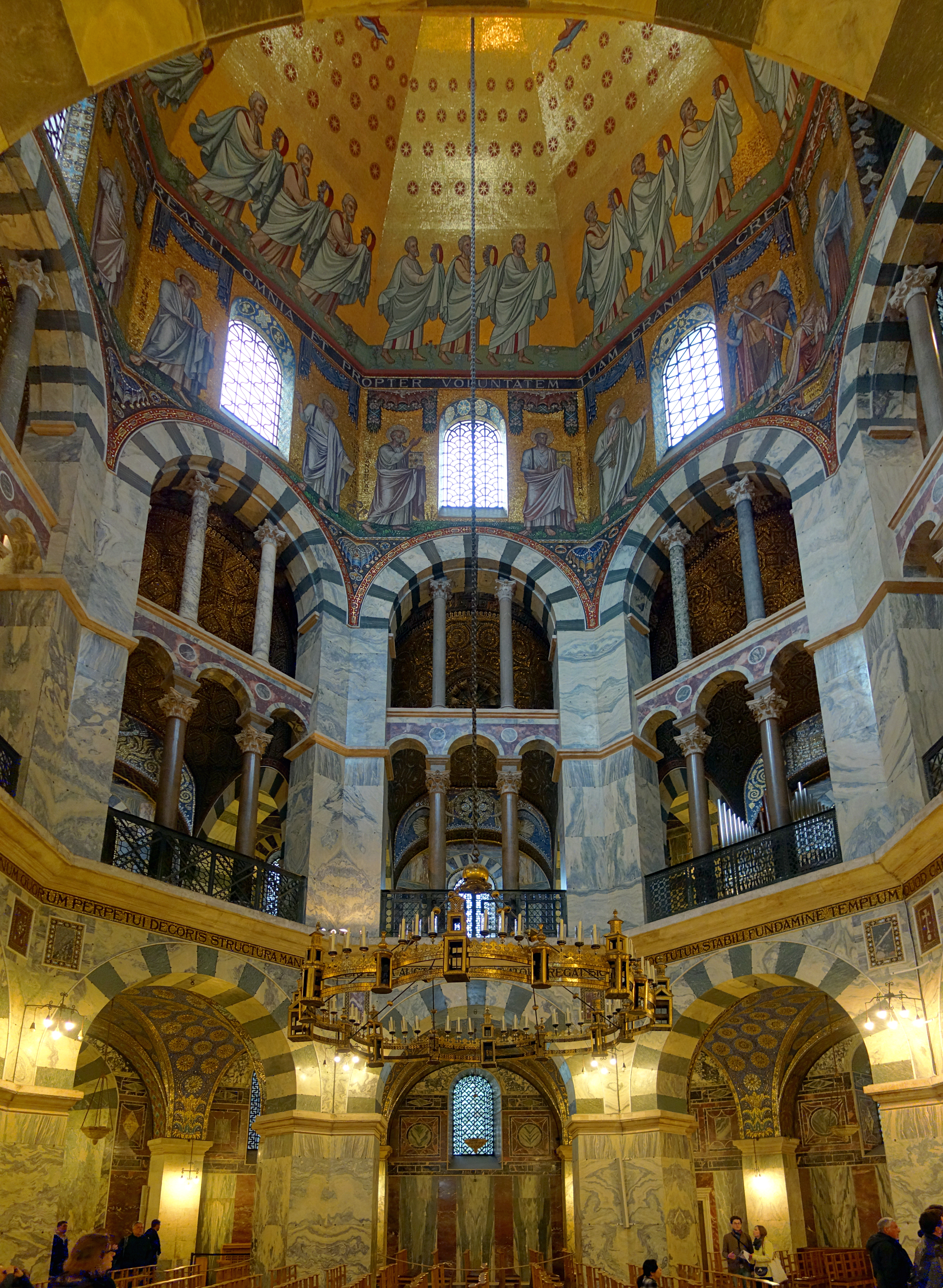
Palatine Chapel (Octagon) in Aachen, Germany, now the central part of the Aachen Cathedral

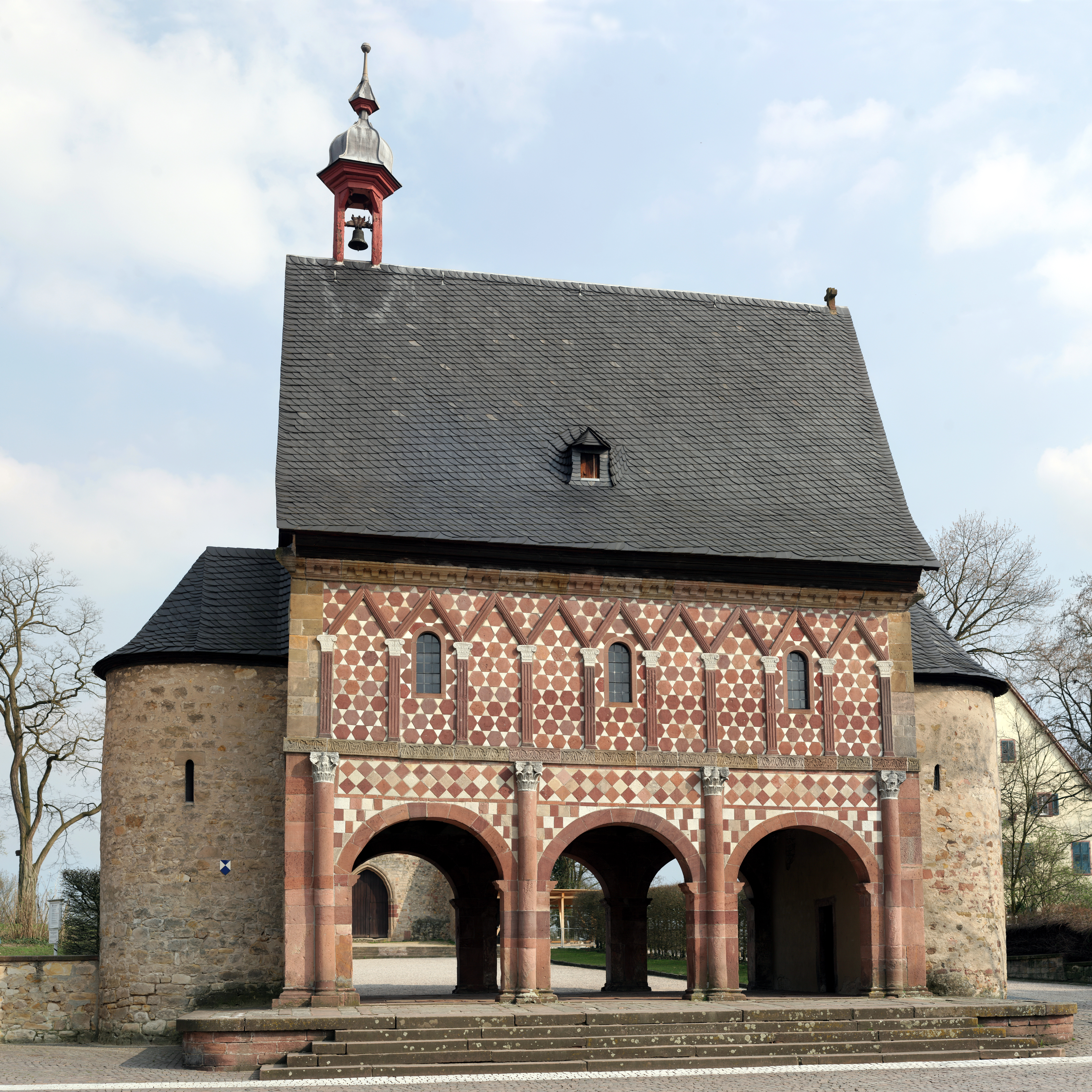
Lorsch monastery gatehouse, Lorsch, Germany

Carolingian architecture is the style of north European Pre-Romanesque architecture belonging to the period of the Carolingian Renaissance of the late 8th and 9th centuries, when the Carolingian dynasty dominated west European politics. It was a conscious attempt to emulate Roman architecture and to that end it borrowed heavily from Early Christian and Byzantine architecture, though there are nonetheless innovations of its own, resulting in a unique character.

The gatehouse of the monastery at Lorsch, built around 800, exemplifies classical inspiration for Carolingian architecture, built as a triple-arched hall dominating the gateway, with the arched facade interspersed with attached classical columns and pilasters above.

The Palatine Chapel in Aachen constructed between 792–805 was inspired by the Emperor Justinian's octagonal San Vitale in Ravenna, built in the 6th century. At Aachen there is a tall monumental western entrance complex, as a whole called a westwork—a Carolingian innovation.

Carolingian churches generally are basilican in form, like the Early Christian churches of Rome, and commonly incorporated westworks, which is arguably the precedent for the western facades of later medieval cathedrals. An original westwork survives today at the Abbey of Corvey, built in 885.

== Carolingian architecture ==
The Carolingian Renaissance generated such a construction boom that between 768 and 855, 27 new cathedrals, 417 monastic buildings and 100 royal residences were built. Just during Charlemagne's reign, 16 cathedrals, 232 monasteries and 65 palaces were built. The kings were not only responsible for the construction sites but they also provided the architects and the funding. The rediscovery of the architecture treatises written by Vitruvius enabled the building in stone, a material previously little used north of the Loire Valley. During their travels to Italy, the Carolingians discovered the Roman basilicas and triumphal arches. The architects did not simply copy the Roman forms but rather adapted their plans to serve the needs of the royal and religious ceremonies. Most of the architectural elements invented at the beginning of the Carolingian period were refined over decades and successively adapted to eventually lead to the Romanesque architecture of the 11th century.

The archaeological evidence indicates that in addition to religious architecture, there once existed an abundance of secular buildings, most of which no longer exist. Any occasional vestiges of secular buildings are only being evident from the air by means of outline shadows, and many have been incorporated into subsequent buildings. This can be attributed to the fact that secular building in stone (such as castles) was not introduced until the following centuries. Only in the case of Carolingian palaces has archaeology made a serious attempt to recover the foundations and attempted scientific reconstructions.

The first period of Carolingian architecture, during the reign of Pepin the Short and the beginning of Charlemagne's reign, was driven by powerful ecclesiastic figures such as bishop Chrodegang of Metz, Fulrad, abbot of Saint-Denis, and Manassès, abbot of Flavigny Abbey.

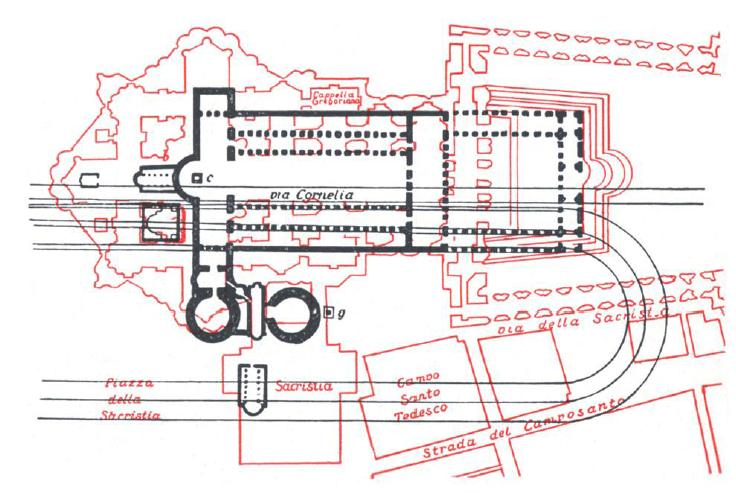
Old St. Peter's Basilica in Rome

The pope wanted to reorganise and standardise the Catholic Church with the help of Charlemagne. Bishop Chrodegang introduced the Roman liturgical services which resulted in important changes in the architecture. The orientation of the churches was defined so that the altar would be located at the eastern end while the entrance would be at the western end. The St. Peter's Basilica in Rome, the Church of the Holy Sepulchre in Jerusalem and the early Christian art and architecture became the main references for the Carolingian designers.

During the years 780–790, the creation of Lorsch Abbey, the expansion of the Princely Abbey of Corvey, and the foundation of the abbeys of Saint-Riquier and Fulda marked a new departure. The Palace of Aachen with its Palatine Chapel was the culmination of this period.

Towards the end of Charlemange's reign architecture projects multiplied, some very ambitious, as well as the integration of the liturgical services and the codification of the monastic architecture. The Plan of Saint Gall, with its extensive and detailed instructions, though probably never reflecting an actual reality, is an important example of how the architectural elements of a Christian monastery were defined during this period to establish a classic style.

The decline of the Carolingians started during the 10th century and culminated in 1000–1020, when the Carolingian institutions collapsed in France while in Germany the new Ottonian dynasty developed an Ottonian architecture, which borrowed numerous elements from the Carolingian architecture. A fine example of this is the Eglise Saint-Pierre-et-Saint-Paul d'Ottmarsheim in Alsace, founded around 1030.

== Notable examples ==
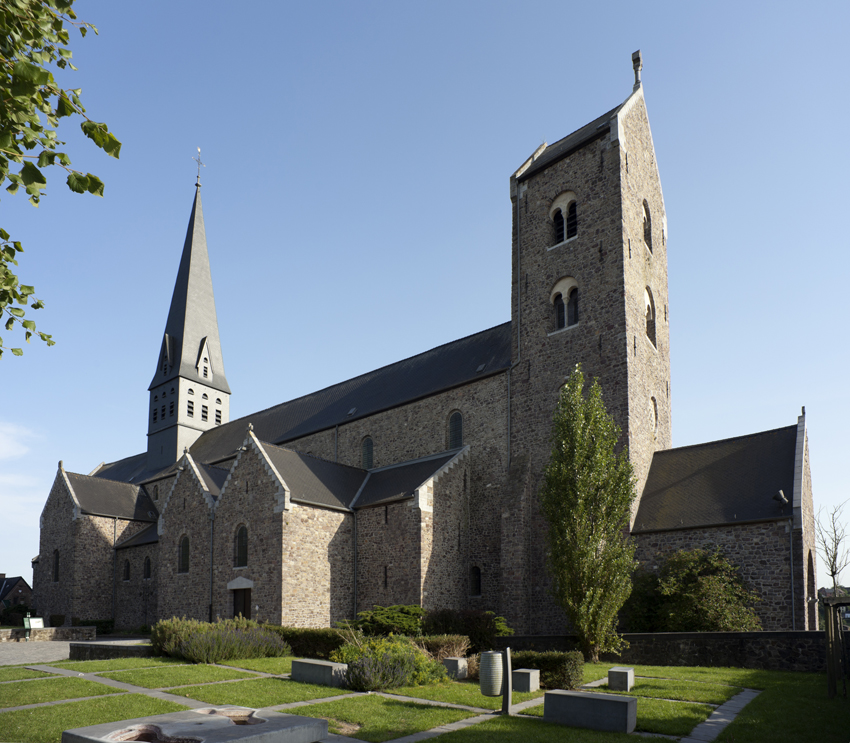
Collegiate Church of Saint Ursmer in Lobbes, Belgium. The tower and spire are later additions.

- Lorsch Abbey, gateway (c. 800)
- Benedictine Convent of Saint John, Müstair (c. 800)
- Palatine Chapel, Aachen (792–805)
- Oratory in Germigny-des-Prés (806)
- Imperial Palace, Ingelheim (completed after 814)
- Abbey in Saint-Philbert-de-Grand-Lieu (815)
- Collegiate Church of Saint Ursmer, Belgium (c. 823)
- St. Michael, Fulda, rotunda and crypt (822)
- Einhard's Basilica, Steinbach (827)
- Saint Justinus' church, Frankfurt-Höchst (830)
- Broich Castle, Muelheim an der Ruhr (884)
- Abbey of Corvey (885)
- St. George, Oberzell in Reichenau Island (888)

== Notable Carolingian architects ==
- Odo of Metz, architect of Charlemagne's Palace of Aachen with the Palatine Chapel
- Ratgar of fulda

== See also ==
- Carolingian art
- Carolingian Empire
- Carolingian church

== Gallery ==
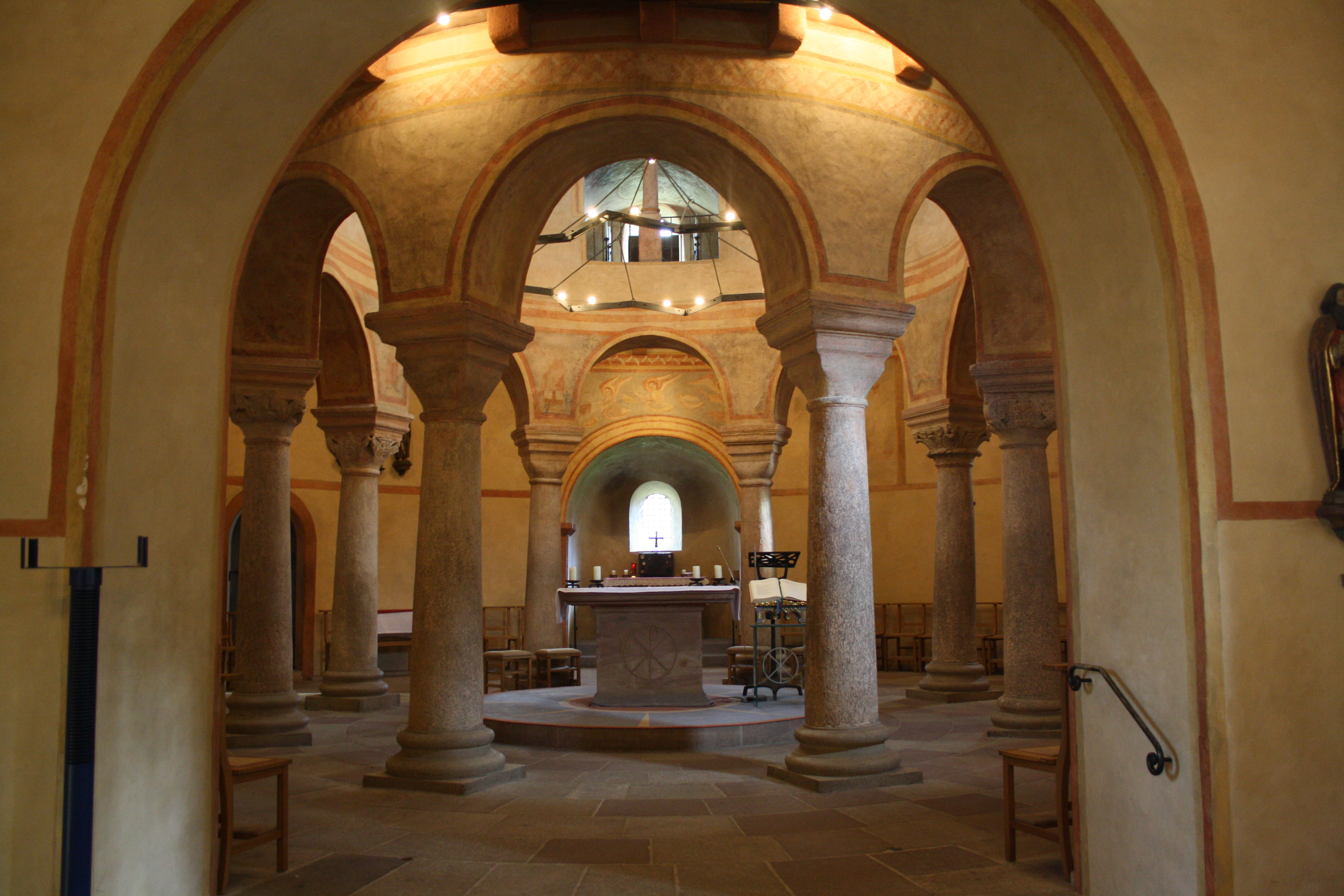
St. Michael's Church, Fulda

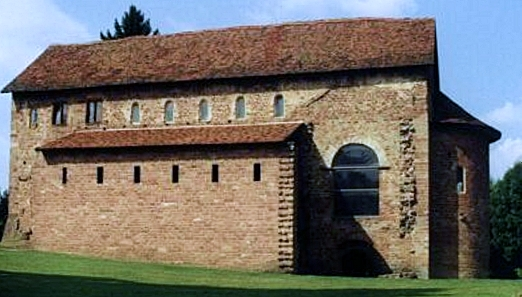
Einhard's Basilica

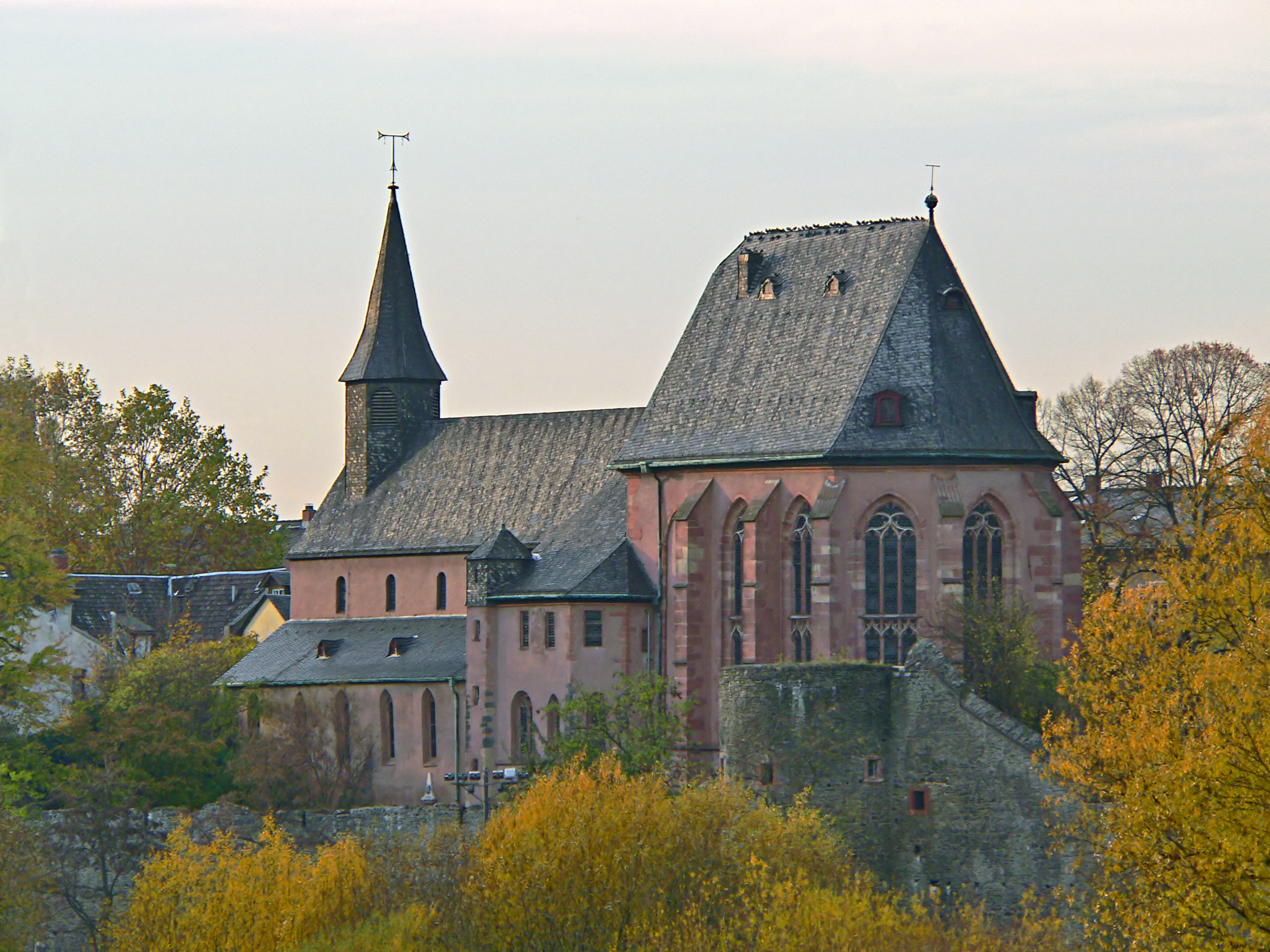
Saint Justinus' church, Frankfurt-Höchst

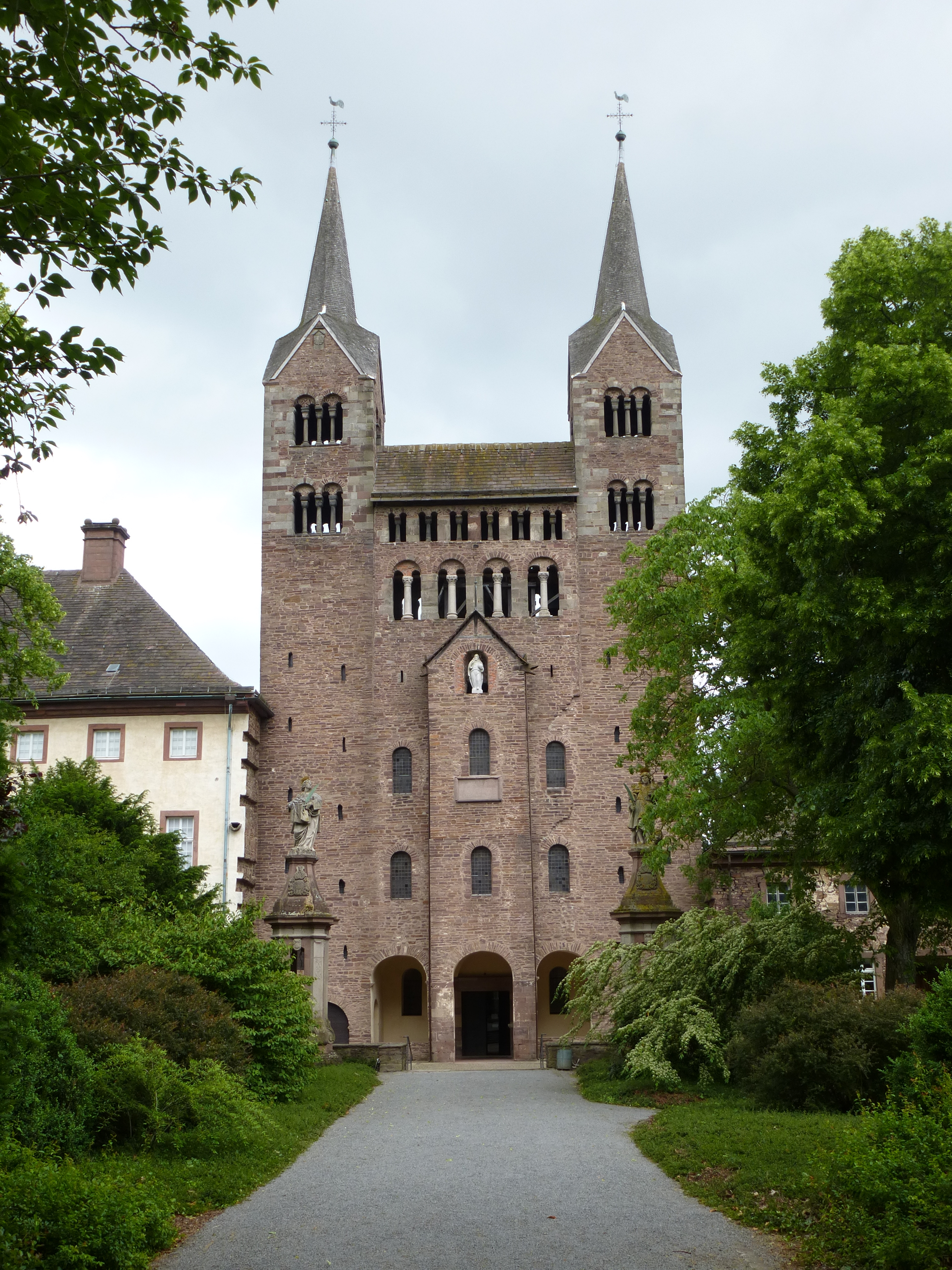
Princely Abbey of Corvey

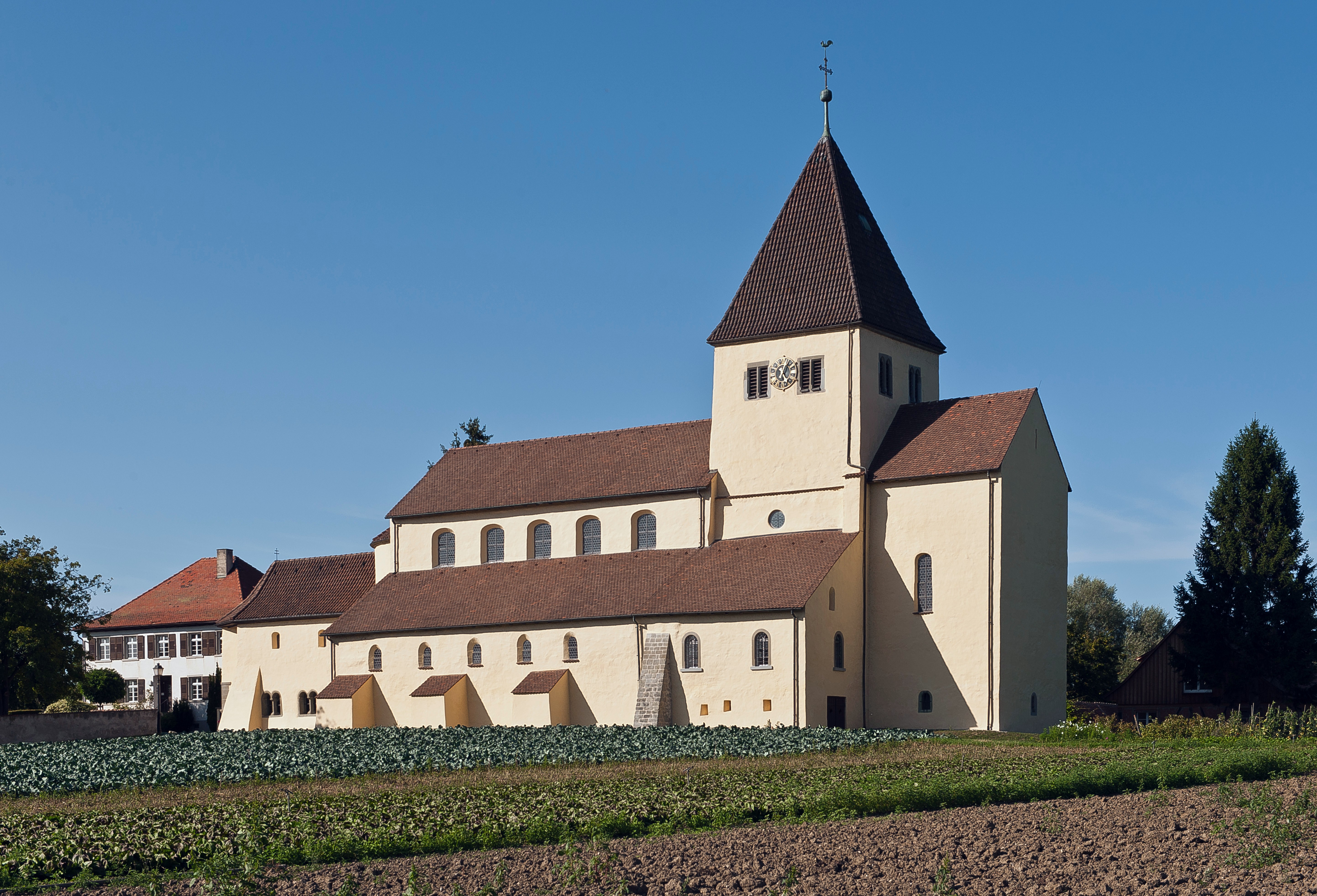
Abbey of Reichenau
