= Ursmar =

Saint Ursmar of Lobbes
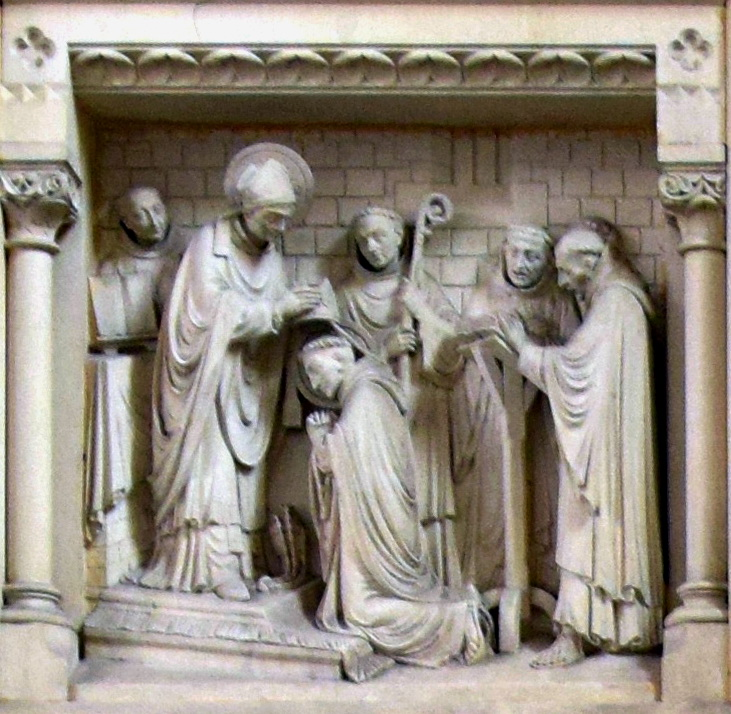
- Ursmar receives holy orders as abbot of Lobbes Abbey in 691, probably by Saint Lambertus, bishop of Maastricht (19th-century relief in the Church of Saint Ursmar in Lobbes)
- Born: 27 July 644
- Died: 18 April 713
- Venerated in: Roman Catholic Church; Eastern Orthodox Church
- Feast: 19 April

Ursmar of Lobbes (Note: also known as Ursmer or Ursmarus) (born 644, died 713) was a missionary bishop in the Meuse and Ardennes region in present-day Belgium, Germany, Luxemburg and France. He was also the first abbot of Lobbes Abbey.

Like many missionaries in the 7th and 8th century, he may have been of Irish origin. He was appointed abbot of Lobbes in 691 by the Frankish king Pippin II. He is also credited with founding Aulne Abbey and Wallers Abbey.

Saint Ursmar is a Catholic saint, whose feast day is April 19. His sarcophagus is in the crypt of the Collegiate Church of Saint Ursmer in Lobbes (as well as the sarcophagus of his successor, Saint Ermin. A Life was written by Heriger of Lobbes.
