= Lobbes Bible =

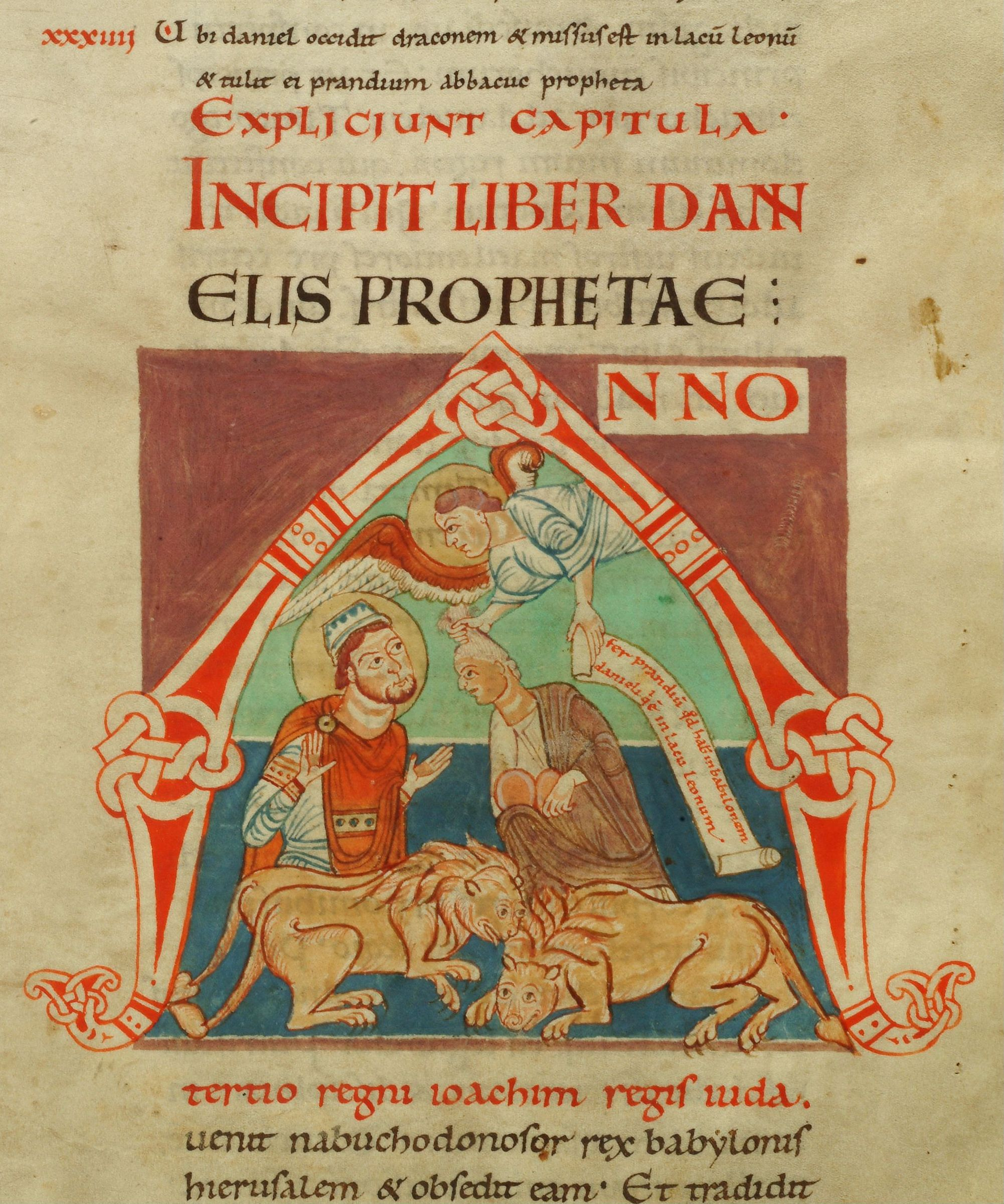
Historiated initial of the letter A, showing the story of Daniel in the lions' den, in the Lobbes Bible.

The Lobbes Bible is an illuminated manuscript from the 11th century, a bible written and illustrated in Lobbes Abbey in present-day Belgium. Only the first volume of two has been preserved, containing parts of the Old Testament. It is richly decorated with inhabited initials, many of them in a style that was innovative for the time, and is one of the earliest medieval manuscripts in which the illustrations are consistently tied to the narrative of the text. The book is preserved in the library of the seminary of Tournai.

== History ==
The Lobbes Bible was written by a monk at the Lobbes Abbey by the name of Goderanus, who wrote the erudite colophon of the book, including the statement that it was finished in the year 1084. At the time, Lobbes Abbey was a centre of learning and intellectual endeavours for a region encompassing the whole of present-day Belgium and a school for intellectuals such as Ratherius. The colophon is written in a way that makes it clear that Lobbes Abbey at the time was leaning towards the Imperial side in the ongoing Investiture Controversy. The bible originally consisted of two volumes; the second may have been made by the same scribe or another from the same scriptorium. The second volume contained the end of the Old Testament and the entire New Testament, and was last attested in the abbey library in 1788.

The bible was lent to Franciscus Lucas Brugensis in Leuven before 1580, and was used in his work for the Leuven Vulgate. It was subsequently returned to the abbey (it is listed in a catalogue of the abbey library from 1629) where it remained.

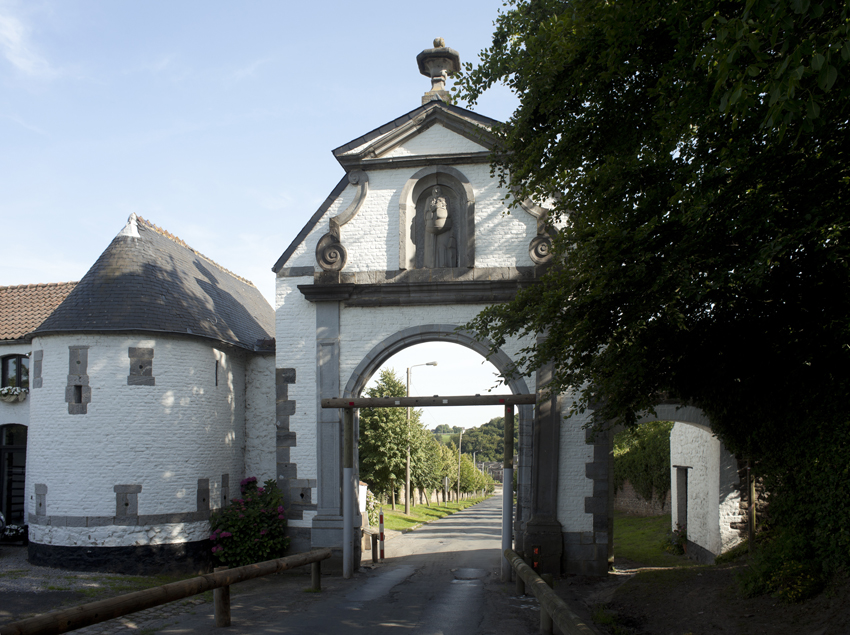
Former gatehouse of Lobbes Abbey. The manuscript was made and kept in the abbey until its destruction in 1794.

Lobbes Abbey, together with its library, was burnt by French troops under the command of Louis Charbonnier on 11 May 1794, during the French Revolutionary Wars. Several of the remaining monks later joined the Seminary of Tournai in Tournai, established in 1808, and it is possible that the manuscript had been safeguarded by one of the monks and in this way came to Tournai. The Lobbes Bible is today still part of the library collections of the Seminary of Tournai.

Since 2012, it is classified as a piece of heritage of particular value (trésor) by the French Community of Belgium.

== Description ==
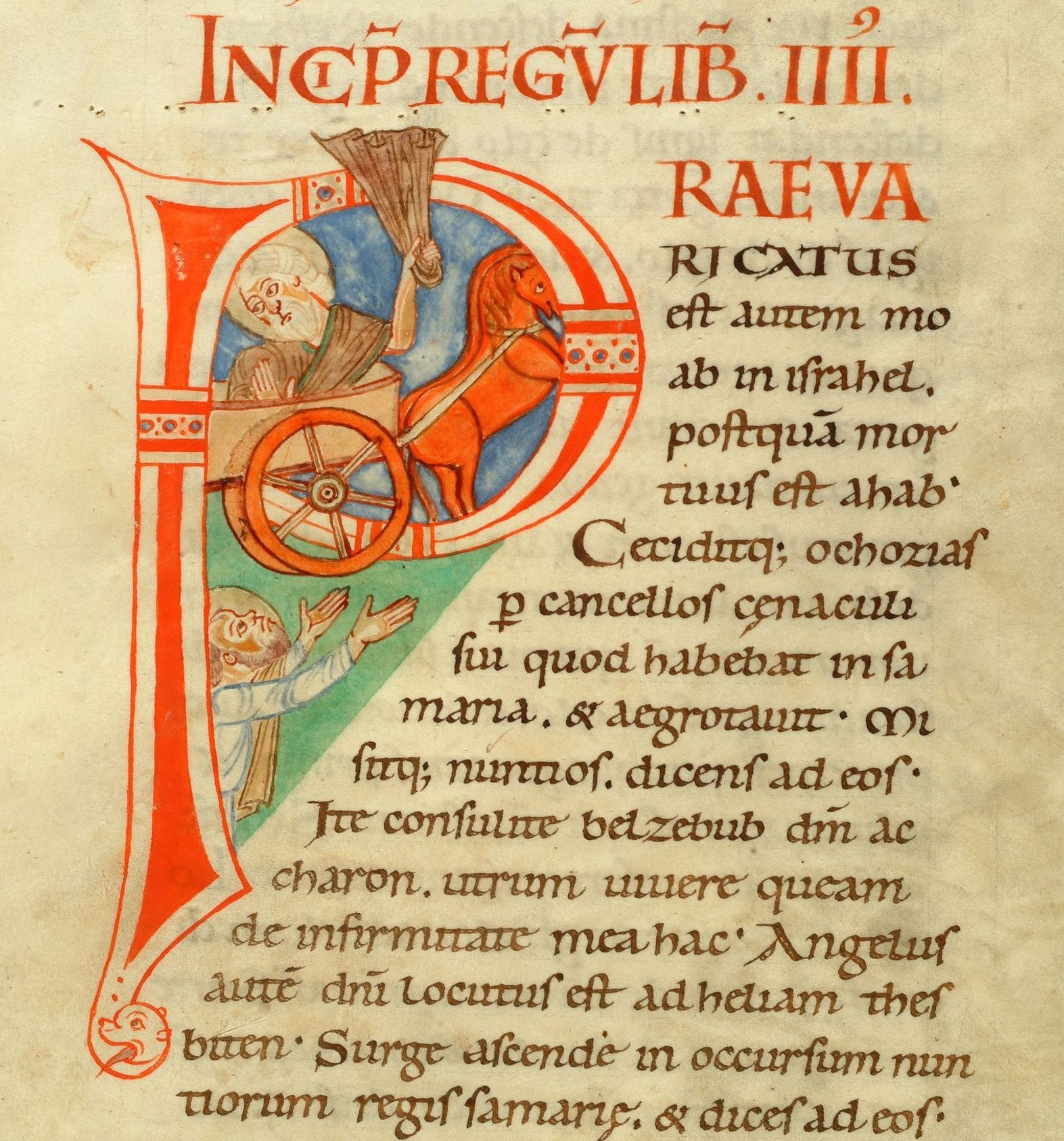
The departure of Elijah as depicted in one of the historiated initials

The preserved volume contains a large part of the Old Testament, from Genesis to the Twelve Minor Prophets. The book measures 495 millimetres (19.5 in) by 325 millimetres (12.8 in), and is bound in a 14th century binding, re-decorated with the coat of arms of abbot Guillaume Cordier in the early 16th century. The back was remade in the 18th century. It has 276 leaves and is written on vellum.

The entire manuscript is decorated with historiated initials, in other words initials in which scenes representing part of the narrative of the text are depicted. Almost all of the illustrations appear to have been made by a single person, and it has been suggested that this was the scribe Goderanus. The Lobbes Bible is one of the earliest medieval books in which the illustration is confined to inhabited initials, and in which the illustrations are consistently related to the narrative of the text. The illuminator also showed considerable capacity of innovation in the treatment of individual subjects. For example, the depiction of the creation in the form of a series of small pictures showing the different days of creation, is the first of its kind; it would become a popular way to represent creation in medieval manuscripts. Other examples of a novel treatment of subject matter that would become common later on is the depiction of Daniel in the lions' den, the departure of Elijah, and the illustration of the Book of Leviticus with a scene of animal sacrifice. Stylistically, an influences from Carolingian art, such as the Bible of San Paolo fuori le Mura and the First Bible of Charles the Bald, has been identified.

== Sources cited ==
- Bogaert, Pierre-Maurice (2007). "La Bible de Lobbes à Tournai. Pour l'histoire d'une bible en deux volumes". C@hiers du CRHiDI. Histoire, droit, institutions, société (in French). 28. Centre des Recherches en Histoire du Droit, des Institutions et de la Societé: 95–124.
- Denny, Don (1976). "The Historiated Initials of the Lobbes Bible" (PDF). Revue belge d'Archéologie et d'Histoire de l'Art / Belgisch Tijdschrift voor Oudheidkunde en Kunstgeschiedenis. 45 (2). Royal Academy of Archaeology of Belgium: 3–18.
- Dolbeau, François (2007). "La bibliothèque de Lobbes, d'après ses inventaires médiévaux. Bilan et perspectives". C@hiers du CRHiDI. Histoire, droit, institutions, société (in French). 28. Centre des Recherches en Histoire du Droit, des Institutions et de la Societé: 59–84.
- Kwakkel, Erik; Thomson, Rodney, eds. (2018). The European Book in the Twelfth Century. Cambridge: Cambridge University Press. ISBN 978-1-107-13698-4.
- Leclercq–Marx, Jacqueline; Thys, Noémi (2007a). "Les initiales historiées. Quelques hypothèses et apports nouveaux [part 1]". C@hiers du CRHiDI. Histoire, droit, institutions, société (in French). 28. Centre des Recherches en Histoire du Droit, des Institutions et de la Societé: 169–188.
- Leclercq–Marx, Jacqueline; Thys, Noémi (2007b). "Les initiales historiées. Quelques hypothèses et apports nouveaux [part 2]". C@hiers du CRHiDI. Histoire, droit, institutions, société (in French). 28. Centre des Recherches en Histoire du Droit, des Institutions et de la Societé: 169–188.
- Maillard-Luypaert, Monique (2007). "Un manuscrit exceptionnel…". C@hiers du CRHiDI. Histoire, droit, institutions, société (in French). 28. Centre des Recherches en Histoire du Droit, des Institutions et de la Societé: 11–12.
- Rudolph, Conrad (1999). "In the beginning: theories and images of creation in northern Europe in the twelfth century". Art History. 22 (1): 3–55. ISSN 0141-6790.
