= Theodwin of Lobbes =

8th century Belgian abbot

Theodwin was abbot of Lobbes Abbey from 737 until his death some time around 750. During his abbacy he added Fontaine-Valmont (now part of Merbes-le-Château) to the abbey's domains. Unlike his predecessor, Ermin of Lobbes, and his successor, he was not a bishop alongside being abbot.
