= St. Michael's Church, Fulda =

German church circa 744

Coordinates: 50°33′17″N 9°40′20″E

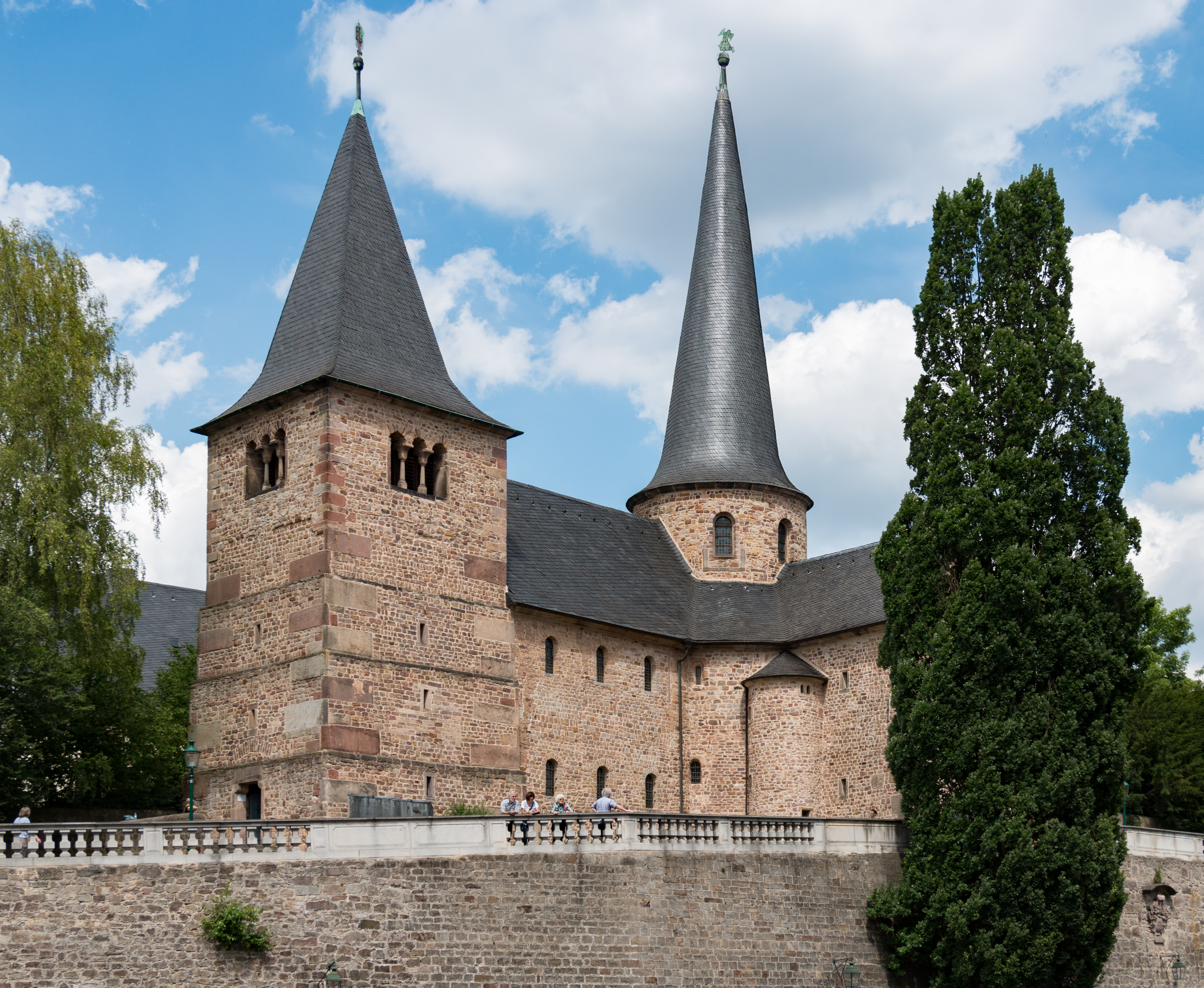
St. Michael's Church, Fulda

St. Michael's Church (German: Michaelskirche) in Fulda, Hesse, is considered to be the oldest replica of the Church of the Holy Sepulchre in Germany, built in the Carolingian architectural style (Pre-Romanesque) on behalf of abbot Eigil in the years (820 – 822). It served as a burial chapel to Fulda monastery founded in 744, which was one of the prominent cultural centres of the early Middle Ages. St. Michael stands in the neighbourhood of Fulda cathedral, and the architect was probably the monk Racholf (d. 824). The rotunda and crypt remain preserved from this time. In the 10th and 11th century, the church was extended from the rotunda, and a west tower was built. In 1618 the roof over the rotunda was rebuilt with a conical roof, and in 1715 – 1716 a chapel was added to the north side. It was restored in 1853. Wall paintings in the interior date from the 11th century.

== See also ==
- Saint Michael: Roman Catholic traditions and views
- Early medieval domes
