= Westwork =

Church architectural feature

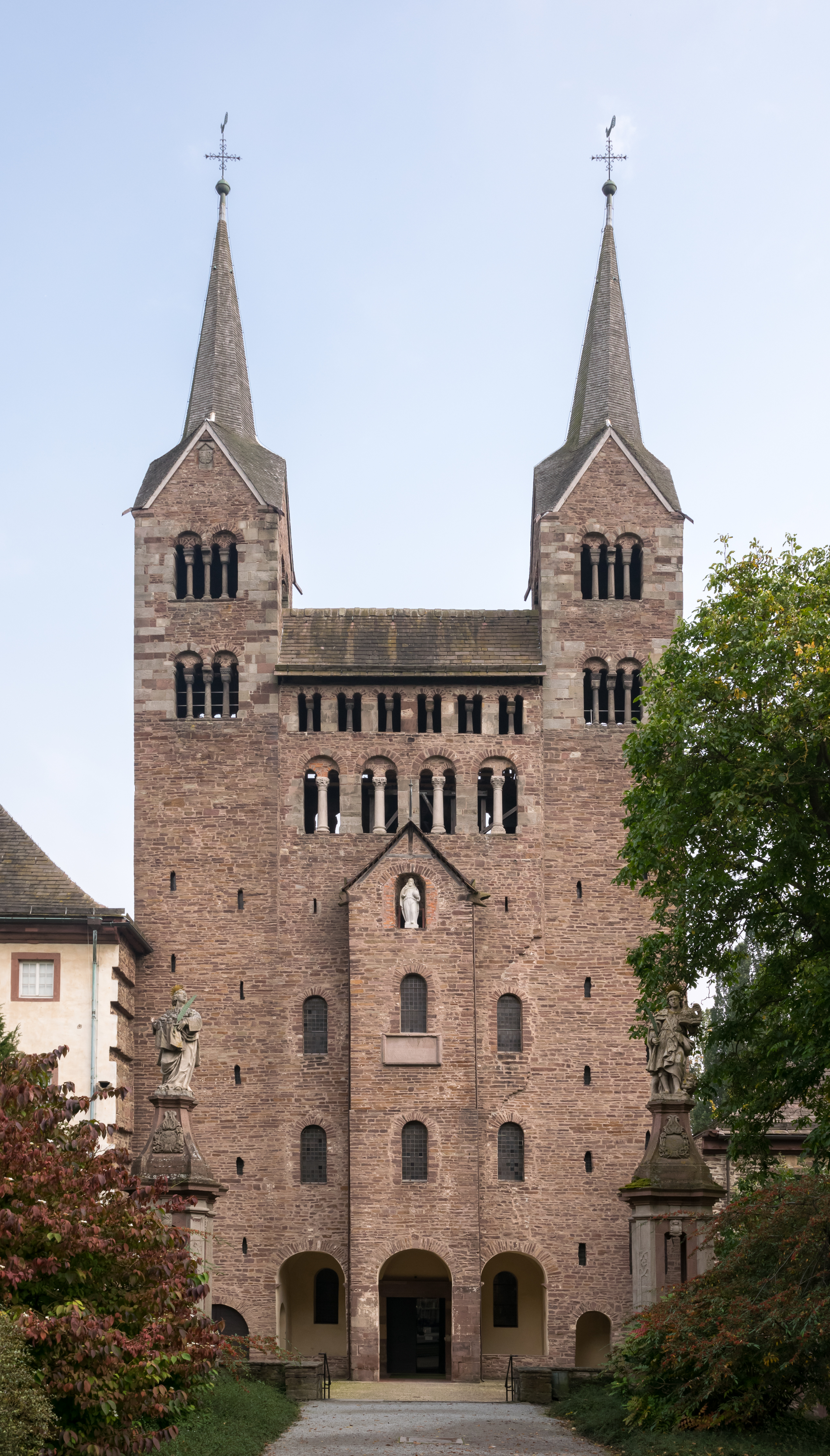
Westwork of Corvey Abbey

A westwork (German: Westwerk), forepart, avant-corps or avancorpo is the monumental, west-facing entrance section ("west front") of a Carolingian, Ottonian, or Romanesque church. The exterior consists of multiple stories between two towers. The interior includes an entrance vestibule, a chapel, and a series of galleries overlooking the nave. A westwork is usually broader than the width of the nave and aisles. It is sometimes used synonymously with narthex. The structural purpose of the massive westwork is to resolve the horizontal thrust of the east-to-west arcades of the nave. Church towers as a part of a church began with the construction of the first westworks.

Charlemagne dreamt of reviving the Roman Empire in the West. His dream along with his artistic skillset allowed him to implement artwork into buildings with westwork during this time period and can be found in the Corvey Abbey and scattered throughout other westwork buildings today.

The Corvey Abbey (built in 885) located in Germany is the oldest example of westwork to date. The Corvey Abbey provides an example of westwork preserved from the time being built. The frescoes (originally of the 9th century) inside the westwork show scenes from the Odyssey. The King, later the Emperor, and his entourage lodged in the westwork when visiting the abbey during their travels around the country. This is known as the Kaiserloge on the upper, or second story. The centered room located on the main floor surrounded on all three sides by galleries as well as an arch found in the entrance hall of the Corvey Abbey shows an example of ancient styles used during this time. Westwork from the Corvey Abbey provided a basis in the following years for more architectural advancements in the Romanesque and Gothic periods.

The primary source of Trajan's Aqueduct, the Aqua Traiana, a nymphaeum known as the Madonna della Fiora near Rome, is documented in the Historical Diocesan Archive of Nepi and Sutri as having been converted into a church in medieval times by constructing a westwork. "It was adapted to a church by building a two-floor masonry forepart: the lower floor as the facade of the church; the upper floor as residence of the parish priest divided into 5 rooms."

The feature was introduced into Norman architecture in the 11th century by Robert of Jumièges at the church of Jumièges Abbey, consecrated in 1067. The pattern was continued in German Gothic architecture.

== Sources ==
- Heyman, Jacques (2015). "Strainer arches". Construction History. 30 (2). The Construction History Society: 1–14. ISSN 0267-7768. JSTOR 44215905.
