= Ottonian architecture =

Architectural style

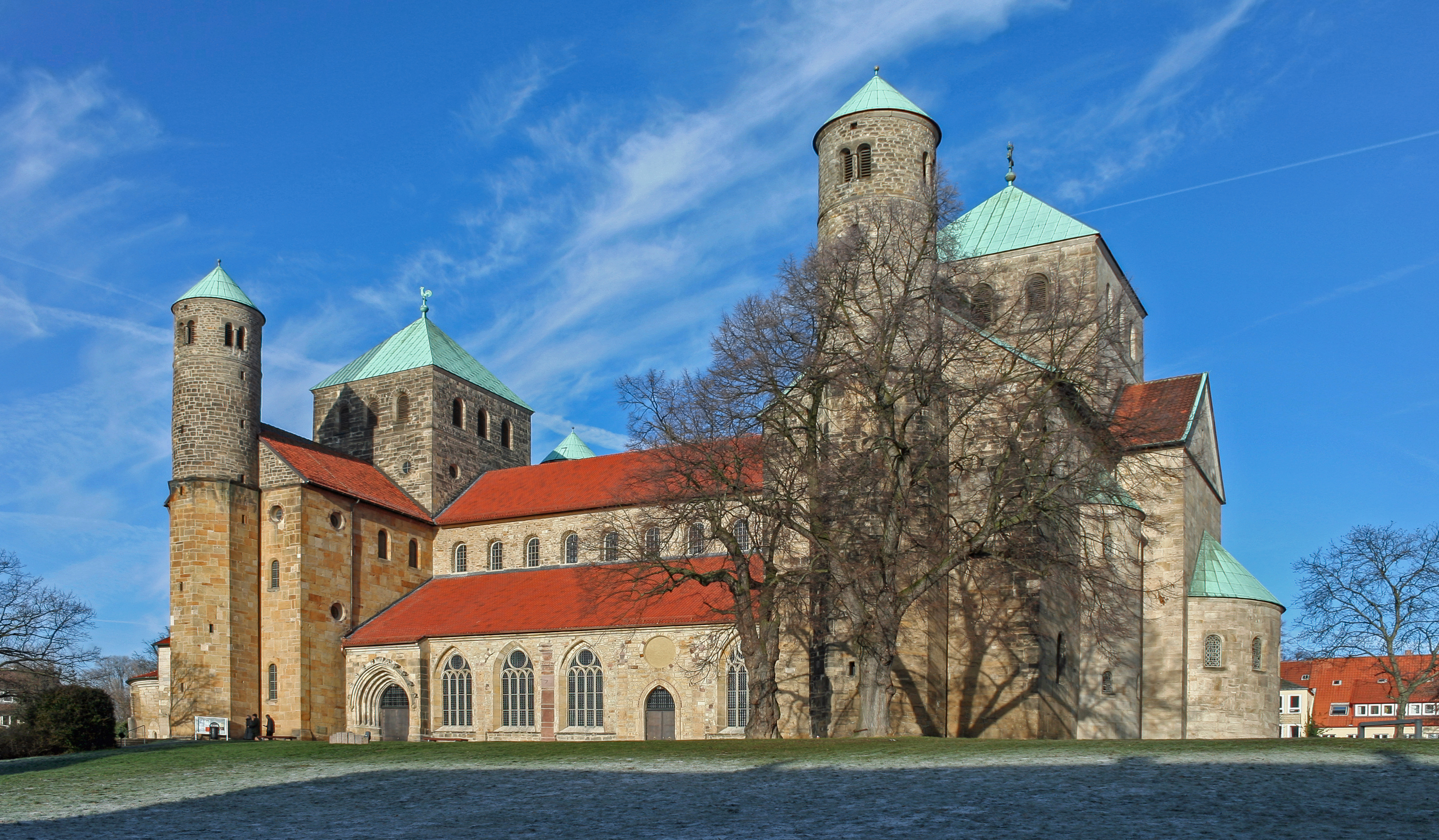
St. Michael's Church, Hildesheim

Ottonian architecture is an architectural style which evolved during the reign of Emperor Otto the Great, essentially surviving in churches. The style was found in Germany and the low countries and lasted from the mid 10th century until the mid 11th century. It is a phase in the Pre-Romanesque art and architecture under the Ottonian dynasty, with most large churches built with imperial patronage.

== History ==
Ottonian architecture draws its inspiration from Carolingian and Byzantine architecture. Ottonian architecture also draws from Christian art. Otto I transported marble columns from Italy to use in his churches in Germany. Though it has very similar characteristics to Carolingian architecture, the difference is in the Ottonian architects who used classical elements in state of the art ways to create what is known as Ottonian architecture. Apart from some examples influenced by the octagonal Palatine Chapel at Aachen such as Ottmarsheim (11th century, Alsace) and the apse of the abbey of the Holy Trinity at Essen, religious architecture tends to diverge from the centralised plan. Inspiration from the Roman basilica remains, and Ottonian architecture preserves the Carolingian double ended feature with apses at either end of the church.

Ottonian architecture, especially in the creation of churches, are influenced by the Roman basilica. The churches from this era feature long naves and apses.The architectural engineering of their buildings relied heavily on mathematics, which can be seen in how Ottonian structures measurements are calculated by square unit and in how symmetrical the interior and exterior layouts are.> A distinct feature of this style are thin strips on the outer walls of buildings made out of stone. This design feature was derived from Italy and Roman architectural styles. This can be especially seen churches from this period and is typically just used as a design feature. Saint Michael's Church, Hildesheim is one of the rare Ottonian churches that still has its distinctive architectural style. In the Ottonian and Carolingian churches, the use of several altars, transepts, as well as crypts became more prominent. Brother of Otto the Great, Bruno the Great, worked to design, construct as well as reconstruct many buildings in the Ottonian architectural style.

== Function ==
Surviving Ottonian architecture reveals the function of the construction of these large buildings was primarily religious and governmental.

Ottonian kings, heavily influenced by the rule of Charlemagne and his empire, sought to emphasize the importance of the Christian faith. Beginning with Otto I, they achieved this by unifying their roles both as kings and religious leaders of the time, connecting the previously isolated churches of the prior Saxon rule through generous land grants to the churches. Ottonian architecture played a role in the rituals of the Holy Roman Empire, such as the coronations of emperors and burial locations for members of the royal family. The size and setting of these buildings became paramount for their importance as they served to legitimize royal and Christian authority. The ability to gather a large audience to bear witness to the rituals and royal ceremonies of the time increased in importance as Ottonian kings attempted to maintain the grandeur and scale of the Carolingians. This may have led to the adoption of churches to serve both as a places of worship and gathering halls for official ceremonies.

The architecture of these buildings also facilitated the monastic tradition. Places like St. Michael's Church the under the Bishop Bernward served both as a location for the creation of relics and manuscripts and as a place for the storage of these holy creations. Other cathedral schools, such as the one in Mainz became renowned for their production of illuminated manuscripts, including The Codex Sangallensis 398. Despite Otto III's personal pilgrimage's to Rome and Aachen, very little documented pilgrimages occurred in the years of the Ottonian Dynasty (919–1024). However, locations would receive more visitors when pilgrimage gained popularity in later years.

== Examples ==
=== Church at St. Michael's ===
One of the best preserved examples of Ottonian architecture is The Church of St. Michael located in Hildesheim, Germany. Famously commissioned by Bishop Bernward, construction started in 1010 and was finished by 1033 after Bernard's death. The church had gained fame for housing a number of artworks and reliquaries before they were later moved to the Cathedral at Hildesheim.

=== Church of Saint Pantaleon ===
The Church of Saint Pantaleon was constructed in Cologne, Germany. Originally, in the 9th century the cite of this building was occupied by a small church outside of the city of Cologne. Later, renovations to transform the church would be made by the patron Archbishop Bruno, the younger brother of Otto the Great. This church, connected closely to the Ottonian royal family, served as the burial spot for both Bruno in 965 and the wife of Otto II in 991.

Depicts the off-kilter footprint of the Abbey Church of Gernrode.

=== Abbey Church of Gernrode ===
The Abbey Church of Gernrode, also known as Saint Cyriakus was commissioned by Margrave Gero. Its architecture differs from many other examples of Ottonian architecture because the corners of the building do not form true right angles. Despite its irregular shape the building maintains the Ottonian standard basilica layout. Other notable features of the church include the 'Lombard' style interior arches which are only stylistic and a flat wooden ceiling.

=== Mainz Cathedral ===
Mainz Cathedral also called the Cathedral of St. Martin, was constructed around 975 under the Archbishop Willigis. Originally, the site held a Roman or Frankish building before Willigis decided to expand it, creating a Ottonian style basilica divided into two chancels with a large west transept. This basilica style church suffered sever fire damage on the day of its consecration in 1009 leading to it being rebuilt by 1036. It was burnt down again in 1081 leaving only a few of the original Ottonian features in the modern cathedral namely, the lower floors of the circular staircases of the towers and parts of the western end.

== See also ==
- Ottonian art
- Ottonian Renaissance
- Category:Ottonian architecture
