= Lobbes Abbey =

Abbey in Belgium

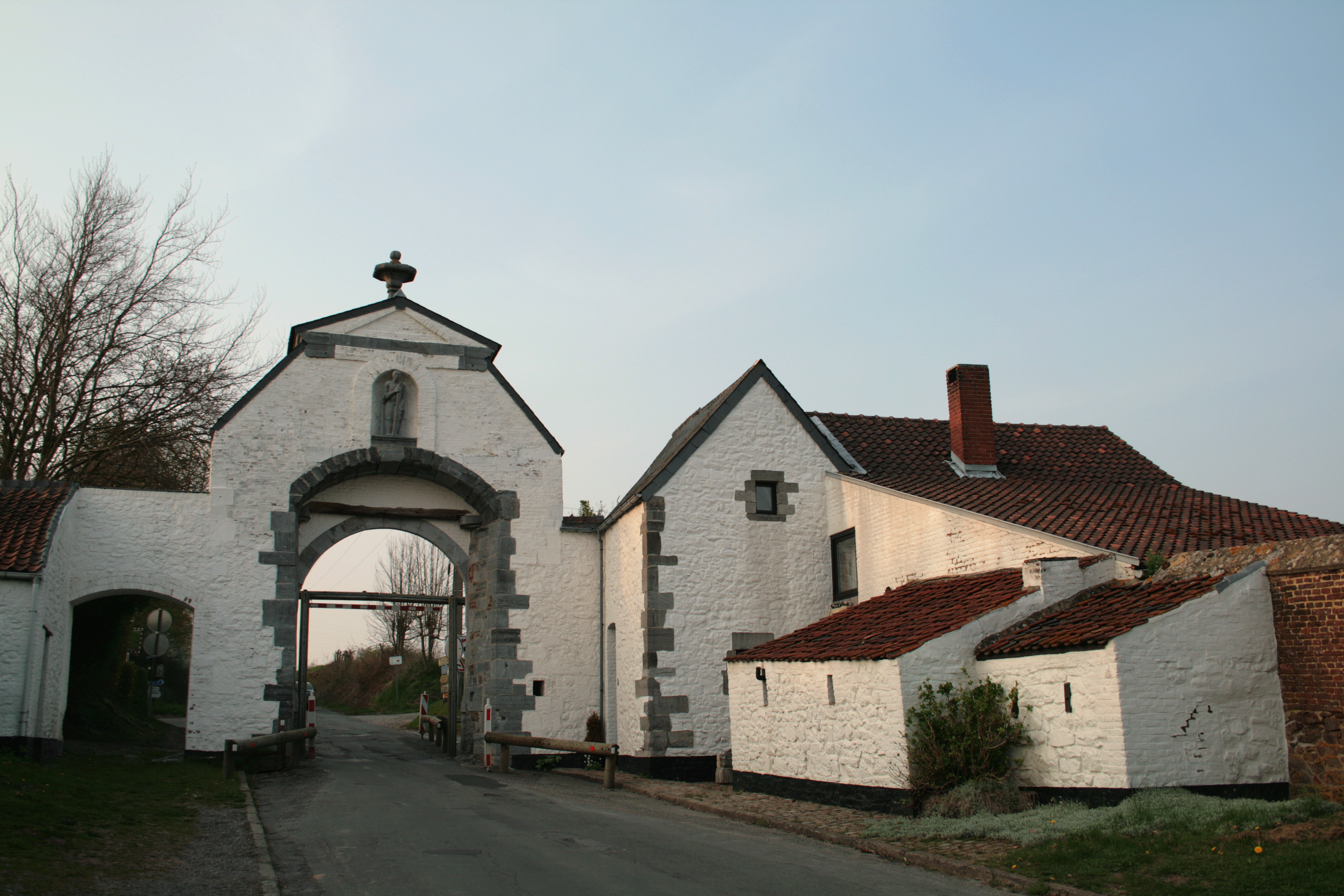
- Former abbey buildings (17th century)
- Interactive map of Lobbes Abbey

Monastery information
- Other name: Abbaye de Lobbes
- Order: Benedictine

Site
- Location: Lobbes, Hainaut
- Country: Belgium
- Coordinates: 50°20′50″N 4°15′40″E

Lobbes Abbey (French: Abbaye de Lobbes) was a Benedictine monastery in the municipality of Lobbes, Hainaut, Belgium. The abbey played an important role in the religious, political and religious life of the Prince-Bishopric of Liège, especially around the year 1000. The abbey's founding saint is Saint Landelin; four other saints are also connected with the abbey.

== History ==
=== Foundation ===
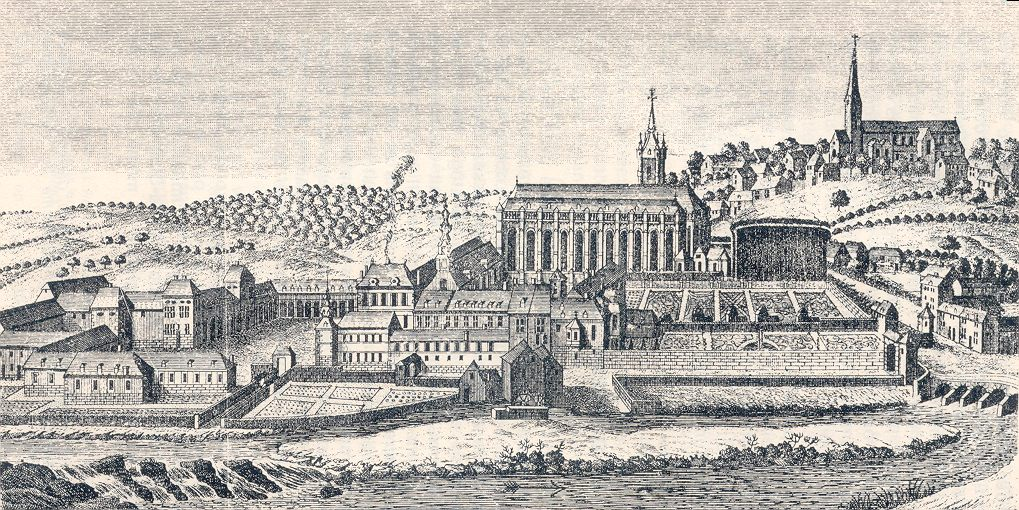
The abbey in the 18th century with both the abbey church (centre right) and the Collegiate Church of Saint Ursmer (right) visible

The early history of Lobbes Abbey is known in relative detail through the fortunate and unusual survival of its annals. The monastery was founded by Saint Landelin around 645. Landelin was a young man from a well-to-do family in Bapaume, who had lived a sinful life as the head of a band of brigands. After repenting, he founded a monastery at the place where he had committed his sins, on the bank of the river Sambre. The number of monks at the new monastery increased rapidly following its instigation. Landelin continued his duties as abbot until 680, when he resigned from his post and dedicated the rest of his life to the worship of God.

=== Early fame ===
Landelin was succeeded by Ursmar (Saint Ursmarus) who devoted himself to preaching Christianity among the largely pagan Franks. The fame of Saint Ursmarus and his successors Ermin of Lobbes, Abel of Reims and Theodulph of Lobbes, made Lobbes the most important monastery in Belgium of the time. Under the sixth Abbot, Anson, (776–800), the abbey's school rose to great fame.

In 864 Hucbert, brother-in-law of Lothair II of Lotharingia, became lay abbot. Through his decadent lifestyle he almost brought the monastery to destitution. His successor, Franco, was both abbot of Lobbes and bishop of Liège, a situation that continued until 960. The abbey largely became a fief of the Bishop of Liège, although ecclesiastically it was situated in the bishopric of Cambrai.

In 954 the abbey was raided and burned during the Hungarian invasions of Europe.

Under the abbots Folcuin (965–990), Heriger of Lobbes (990–1007) and Hugo (1033–1053), the abbey and the school once again attained a great reputation.

During this time they also participated in the ongoing Peace Of God movement. With the Monks in 1060, after the devastation caused by Godfrey III's revolts against Holy Roman Emperor Henry III (1047–56), in which Hainaut and Flanders were involved, commencing a delatio (tour) to regain the Flemish estates in Hainaut that had been destroyed during the war. This here was done to potentially regain the income stream these estates provided to the monastery via donations and/or work. This is all detailed in the Miracula sancti Ursmari (Miracles of Saint Ursmer) in which the monks continuously inspire peace, and end feuds between different feuding factions, sometimes successfully, sometimes unsuccessfully, using relics of Saint Ursmer. In which these kinds of events both help fuel the goodwill mentioned above, through perceived miracle, but also act as grassroots participation and organisation of the Peace of God Movement, which helped Pope Urban II's declaration of the Truce of God in 1095 become implemented in Flanders and its surrounding area more quickly. Along with setting a precedent for the various treaties and councils in this area during this movement from the 1090's to the 1110's.

=== Decline ===
After this period the fame of the abbey gradually declined, until the monastic revival originating from the Bursfelde Congregation brought fresh life in the 15th century. In 1569 Lobbes, St. Vaast's Abbey in Arras, and several other abbeys, were combined to form the Benedictine Congregation of Exempt Monasteries of Flanders.

=== Dissolution ===
In 1794, the last abbot, Vulgise de Vignron, and 43 monks were expelled from the monastery by French revolutionary troops. On 11 May the troops, commanded by General Louis Charbonnier, burnt down the abbey and its library, resulting in the loss of thousands of valuable manuscripts and books. Under the law of 2 September 1796 the abbey was dissolved. Most of the monastic buildings, including the abbey church of Saint Peter, were destroyed. The former burial church of Saint Ursmarus survived as a parish church. A few other minor buildings were later incorporated into a railway station. The holdings of the Abbey library included the Lobbes Bible completed in 1084 AD. The Bible is now part of the Tournai Seminary.

== See also ==
- List of Merovingian monasteries
