= Lobbes =

Municipality in Hainaut Province, Wallonia, Belgium

Lobbes Lôbe (Walloon)
- Municipality
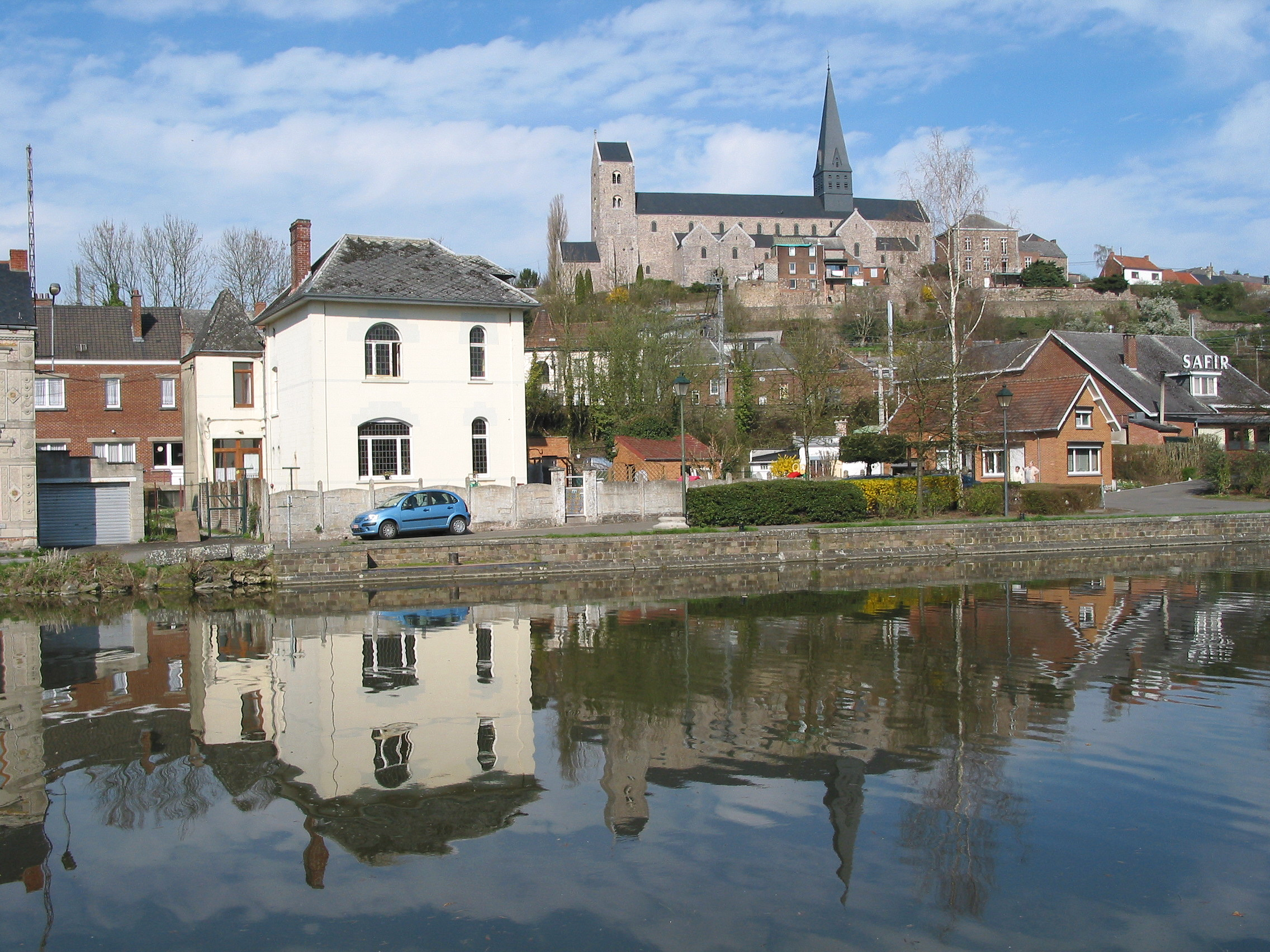
- Lobbes on the river Sambre, with the Collegiate Church of Saint Ursmer in the background

- Flag

- Location of Lobbes in Hainaut
- Interactive map of Lobbes
- Location in Belgium
- Coordinates: 50°21′N 04°15′E
- Country: Belgium
- Community: French Community
- Region: Wallonia
- Province: Hainaut
- Arrondissement: Thuin

Government
  - Mayor: Lucien Bauduin (PS)
  - Governing party: PS - LOB2.0 (MR) - Ecolo

Area
  - Total: 32.23 km^{2} (12.44 sq mi)

Population (2020-01-01)
  - Total: 5,885
  - Density: 182.6/km^{2} (472.9/sq mi)
- Postal codes: 6540, 6542, 6543
- NIS code: 56044
- Area codes: 071
- Website: www.lobbes.be

Lobbes (French pronunciation: [lɔb]; Walloon: Lôbe) is a municipality of Wallonia located in the province of Hainaut, Belgium.

On 1 January 2006 Lobbes had a total population of 5,499. The total area is 32.08 km^{2} which gives a population density of 171 inhabitants per km^{2}.

The municipality consists of the following districts: Bienne-lez-Happart, Lobbes, Mont-Sainte-Geneviève, and Sars-la-Buissière.

The town grew up round Lobbes Abbey, a religious house established here in about 650. The Collegiate Church of Saint Ursmer, that dominates the town from a hill above the Sambre, was built as a burial church for the abbots and monks, largely dates from the 9th century. It is the oldest still functional church in Belgium and an unusually well-preserved example of Carolingian architecture.

The tramway of the ASVi runs through Lobbes.

== Births ==
- Jonas van Genechten, professional road bicycle racer
- Alfred Wotquenne, musical bibliographer
- Romain Zingle, professional cyclist
