= Justin the Confessor =

Roman Christian priest and martyr (died 269)

Saint Justin the Confessor
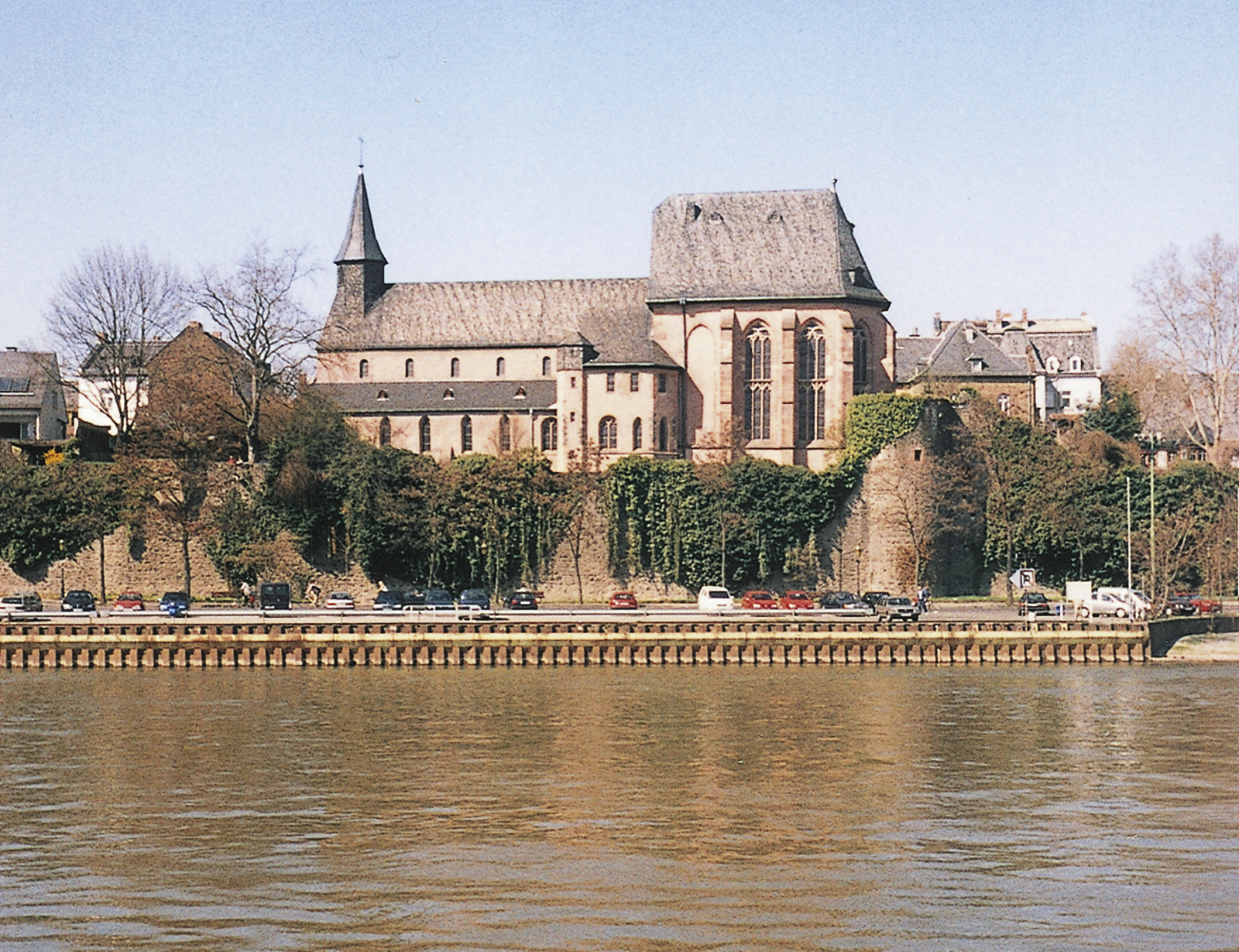
- Saint Justin's Church, Frankfurt-Höchst

Hieromartyr
- Died: 269; Rome
- Honored in: Roman Catholic Church; Eastern Orthodox Church
- Feast: 4 August (Catholic); 17 September (Orthodox)

Justin the Confessor (died 269) was a Christian martyr in the Roman Empire. He is honoured as a saint by the Roman Catholic Church and Eastern Orthodox Church.

== Life ==
Information regarding Justin and Crescentianus comes from the "Passion of Laurentius", in addition a Passio was written about Justin himself.

Justin the Confessor lived in the city of Rome at the time of the persecution of Christians in the Roman Empire. It is believed that Justin was martyred, either under Emperor Claudius II or under Emperor Valerian.

Justin was ordained as a priest by Pope Sixtus II. As a presbyter he led the Christian community of Rome, coming to know personally many important early Christians who were later canonized, and over whose burials he presided as a priest. According to tradition, Justin baptized the widow Tryphonia of Rome and her daughter Cyrilla and, together with Crescentianus, buried the bodies of many martyrs, including those of Pope Sixtus II, Laurentius, Hippolytus, and Romanus of Rome, as well as many other saints in the Catacomb of Cyriaca on the Via Tiburtina - where the church of San Lorenzo fuori le Mura stands today. Justin conducted the funerals of murdered Christians with the participation of the Church of Rome, for example, on the Via Salaria.

When Emperor Valerian heard that Justin worked fearlessly as a leader of the Christians in the community, encouraging them to stand up for their Christian faith, the emperor had him arrested at a funeral and brought to him. Justin was interrogated but would not forswear his faith. Valerian then ordered Justin to be beheaded. After his execution, Justin was buried by his community on the Via Tibutina in the coemeterium of St. Cyriaca.

== Veneration ==
In the 7th century there was still a separate church nearby dedicated to Justin, but not yet rediscovered. The relics of Saint Justin were first taken from Rome by Bishop Hitto of Freising, with the consent of Pope Gregory IV, and brought to be venerated into what is, today, the Archdiocese of Munich and Freising, where they are kept in Freising Cathedral.

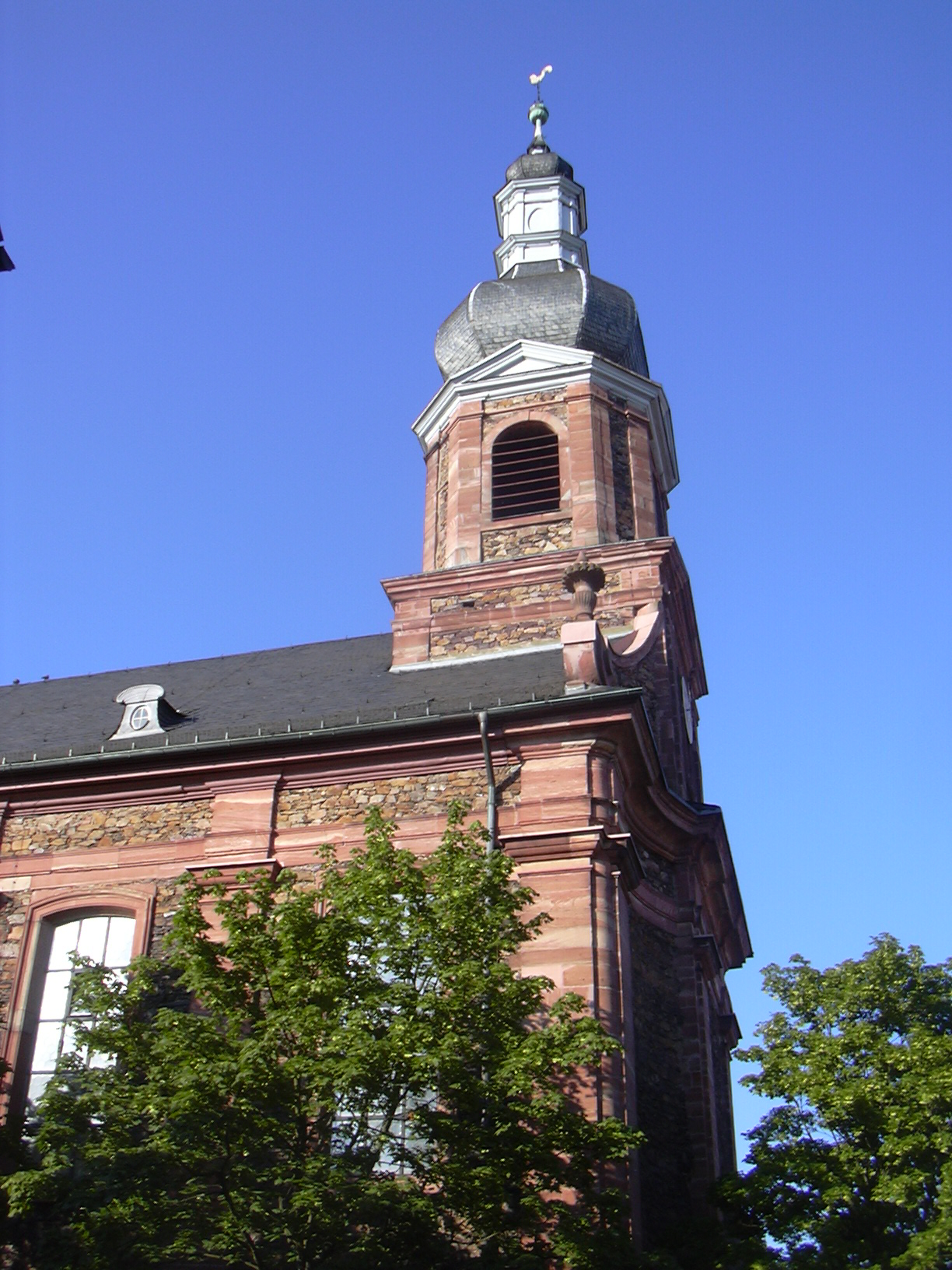
Justinuskirche, Alzenau

In 834, Archbishop Otgar of Mainz made a pilgrimage to the Seven Pilgrim Churches of Rome. Upon his return he brought some of the relics of Justinus. He built Saint Justin's Church in Höchst to house them. Later the relics were moved in 1298 to Saint Alban's Abbey, Mainz; part of the relics, however, ended up in the monastery at the Einhard-Basilika in Seligenstadt. Since the Benedictines there were fellow caretakers of the old parish church of Wilmundsheim, which stood on what is today the graveyard lands, Saint Justin was venerated in Alzenau. The Wilmundsheim church was torn down long ago. Its successor building in present-day Alzenau has Justinus as its patron.Saint Justin's bones have never been in Alzenau.

The feast day of Saint Justin is celebrated in the Roman Catholic Church on 4 August. In the Eastern Orthodox Church, he is celebrated on 17 September.

== See also ==
- Cyriaca

== Literature ==
- Ekkart Sauser (2003). "Justin the Confessor". In Bautz, Traugott (ed.). Biographisch-Bibliographisches Kirchenlexikon (BBKL) (in German). Vol. 21. Nordhausen: Bautz. col. 739. ISBN 3-88309-110-3.
