= Saint Justin's Church, Frankfurt-Höchst =

Roman Catholic church in Frankfurt / Main, Germany

Coordinates: 50°05′55″N 8°32′56″E

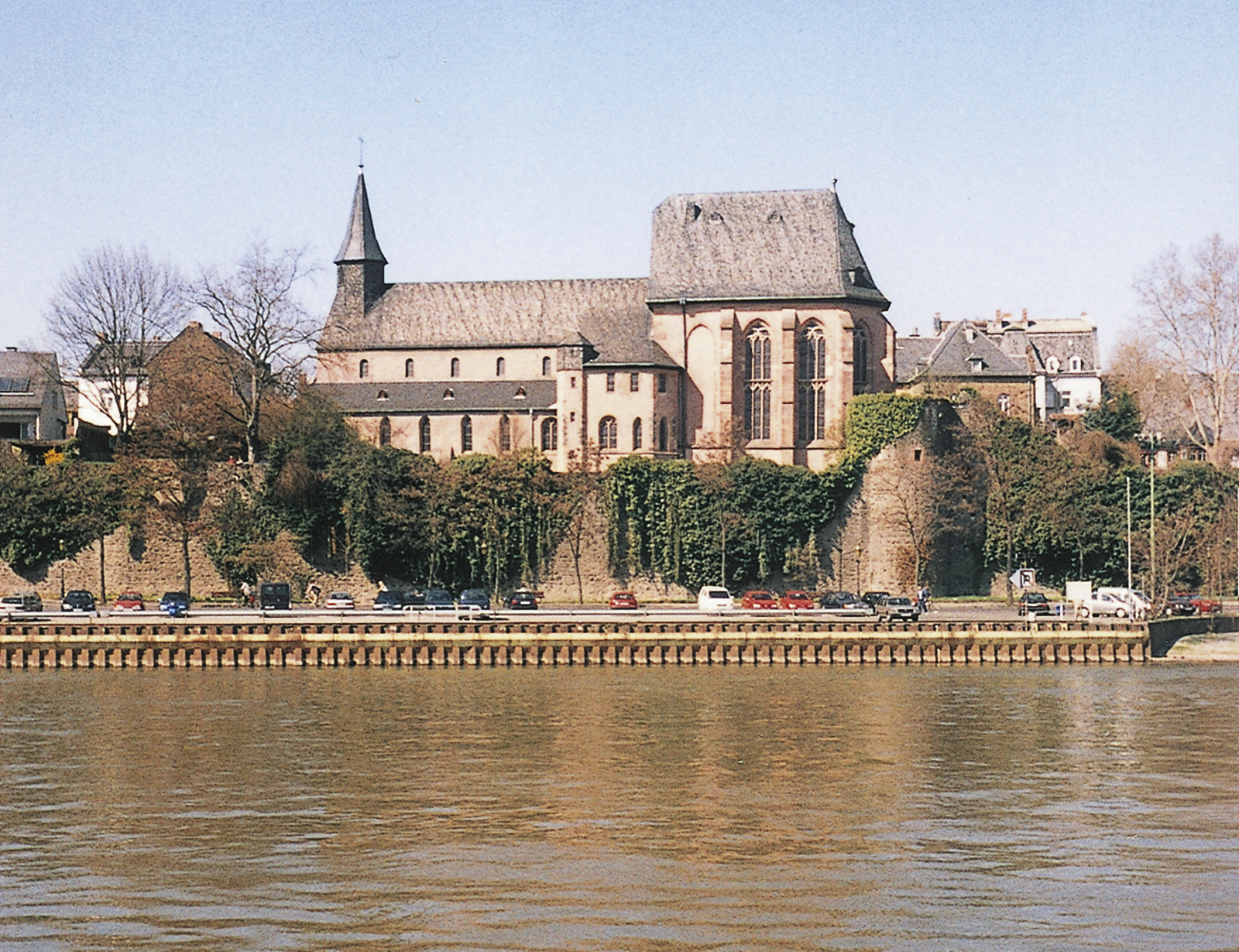
St. Justin's Church in Frankfurt-Höchst

The Carolingian Saint Justin's Church in Frankfurt-Höchst is the oldest building in Frankfurt/Main and one of the oldest churches still existing in Germany. It is dedicated to Saint Justin the Confessor.

The Catholic basilica originates from around 830, and the late gothic chancel was built from 1441. The church stands at the east of the old part of the town Höchst, looking over the Main river.

St. Justin's is important both for its stonework (the Carolingian capitals and the late gothic north doorway), and that it is one of the few nearly completely surviving early medieval churches - which has been continuously used for around 1200 years.

== History of the church ==
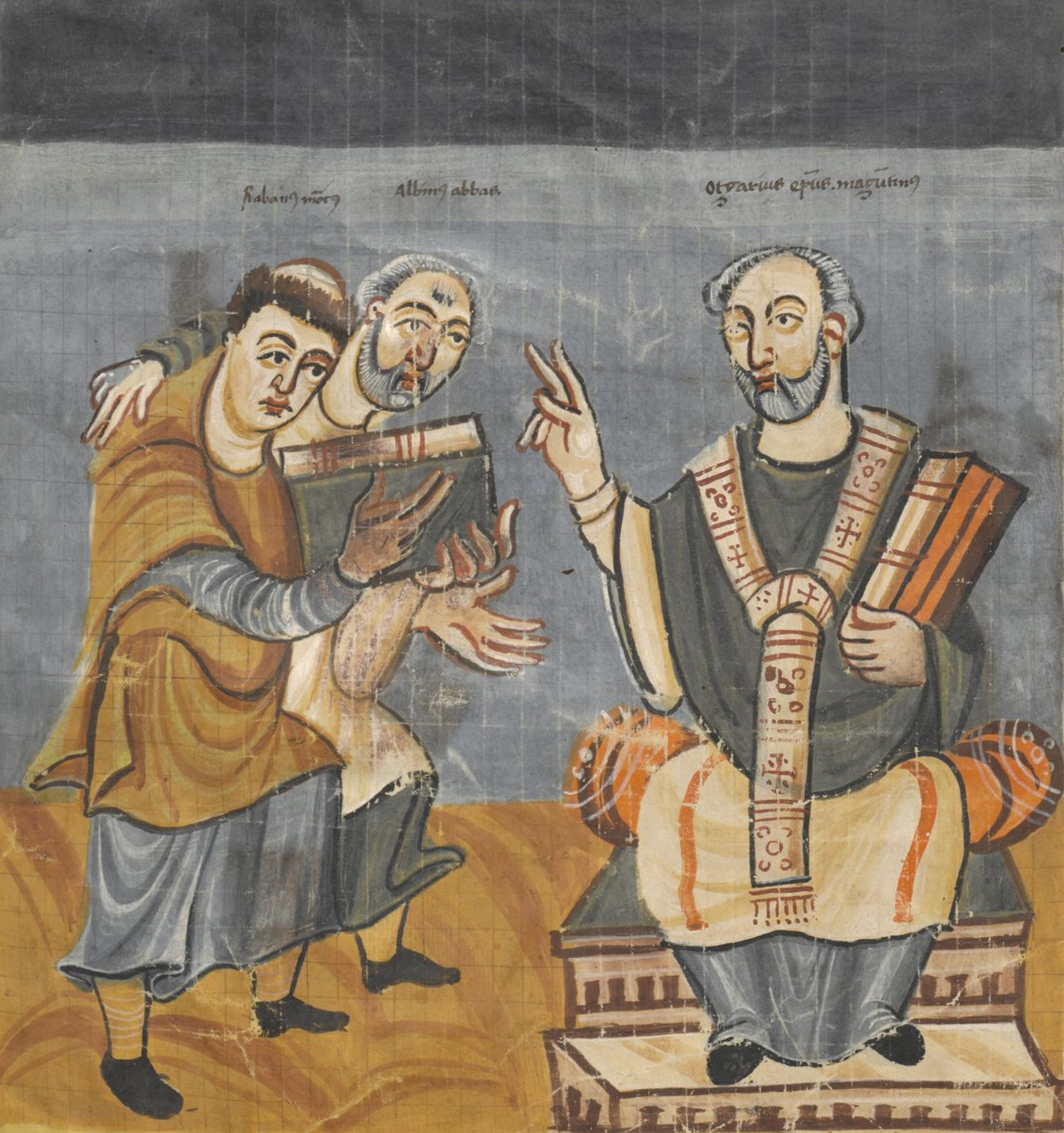
Founders of St. Justin's - Archbishop Otgar of Mainz (right) and Rabanus Maurus (left) from the manuscriptum Fuldense ca. 830

The history of the church is closely connected with the city of Höchst founded in the 8th century as a daughter city of Mainz. The first well known documentary evidence of the city dates from 790.

Construction on St Justin's Church began around 830, once Archbishop Otgar of Mainz had returned from Rome with the relics of St Justin. It was complete by his successor, Rabanus Maurus, who made the final consecration around 850. It did not really serve as a parish church then, but as a symbol for the power of the Electorate of Mainz proximate to the royal court at Frankfurt. The relics of St. Justin the Confessor were brought into the new church, where they remained for about 450 years.

A particular synod of Mainz was held at the church in 1024, and in 1090 it became a Benedictine monastic church of St. Alban's Abbey, Mainz, as well as a parish church. In 1298 the relics of St. Justin were transferred to the mother house, and the church consecrated to St. Margaret, though its dedication to St. Justin remains to this day.

Since 1419 the Margaretenkircheit was used as a parish church. In 1441 it became a monastic church of the Hospital Brothers of St. Anthony, when the brothers moved from Roßdorf. The Antoniter order built the late gothic chancel and made numerous alterations. The older Carolingian part of the church served as a parish church for the community, while the choir, divided by a rood screen, was reserved for the Antonites. It ceased to be a monastic church after secularization in 1802.

The forgotten name Justinuskirche became known again to experts and the public through historical research in the 18th and 19th centuries. The fact that today St. Margaret's Church is once again named after its original patron saint can be traced back to an initiative of the Höchst parish priest Emil Siering (1841-1899).

St. Justin's was restored in the 1930s and 1980s and today belongs to the parish of St. Josef in the Frankfurt district of Roman Catholic Diocese of Limburg. Since 2009, the Justinuskirche has been used as a "summer church" for church services and is a popular venue for weddings.

In 1987/88 a new concert organ from the firm of Orgelbau Kuhn, Männedorf (Switzerland) was installed in the baroque organ case. As a result, it regained its original appearance, but above all its concert quality. Because of its excellent concert organ and acoustics, the Justinuskirche is the venue for organ concerts with international artists, e.g. as part of the Höchster Orgelsommer.

== The Carolingian basilica ==
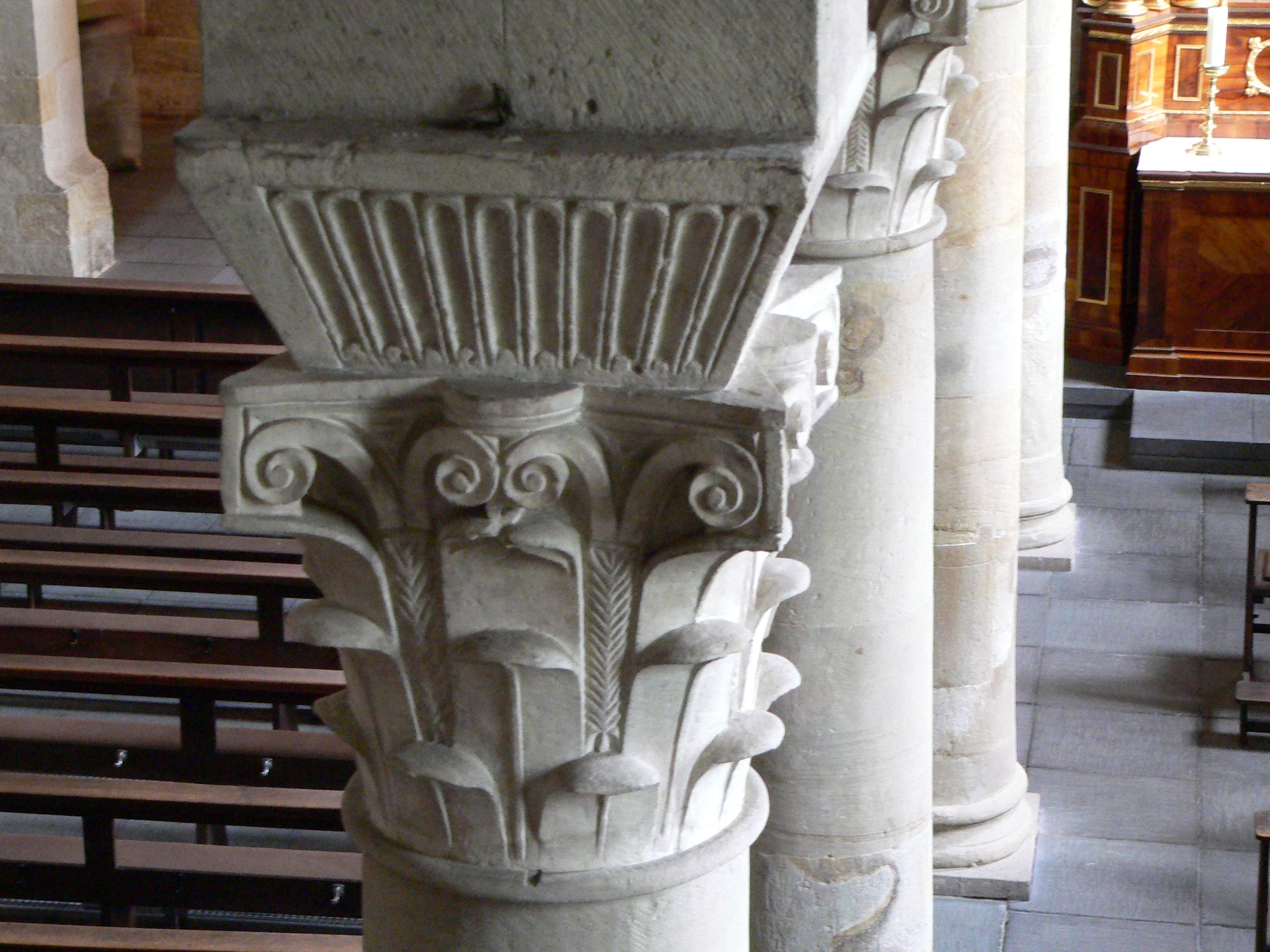
Carolingian capital

The original church was a six-bay basilica with three sanctuaries and apses at the east end. The entrance was originally at the west end of the central nave, but is now on the north side of the church at the northern sanctuary. The aisle windows have been replaced, and late gothic chapels were added on the north side. Also the apses were removed following the alterations.

The remainder of the Carolingian work is however intact: the two other sanctuaries, the central nave with small round-arched clerestory windows, the flat ceiling, the aisles, and at the top of the two sets of five columns - Corinthian capitals, which belong to the most important works of Carolingian art.

== Late gothic additions ==
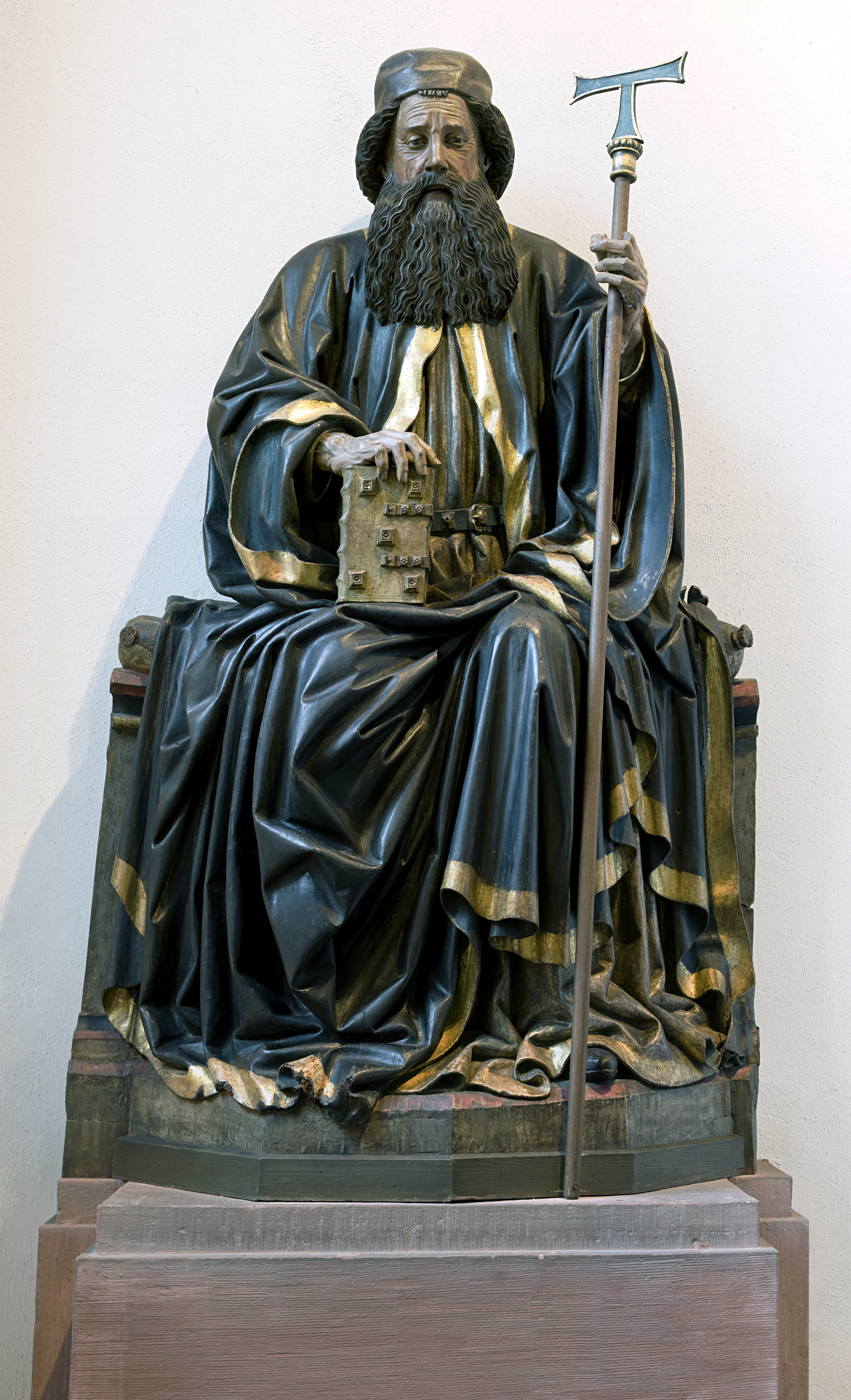
St. Antony the Hermit 1485

Up to the end of the affiliation with the Benedictine monastery of Saint Alban in 1419, the church had hardly changed structurally. In the 1420s the southern Carolingian sanctuary was replaced by a gothic Holy Cross chapel, in the place of today's vestry. To the northern aisle, three further chapels were added.

A life-size wooden statue of St. Anthony the Hermit, made in Worms in 1485, has been preserved. The figure with the original color painting is one of the most important works of sculpture in the Middle Rhine region from the period of late Gothic sculpture. In April 2017, a comprehensive cleaning and restoration was completed by the State Office for Monument Preservation of Hesse in Wiesbaden.

== The high choir (chancel) ==
In 1441, the rules of the Augustinian choir master, under the Antoniter order, required a larger choir, and so a high choir (chancel) was built with a polygonal apsidal end and seven windows. The chancel was clearly higher than the original basilica, and this contrast is certainly visible today. The original vaulting in the chancel had to be taken down in 1523 due to danger of collapse, and is now replaced with a flat ceiling.

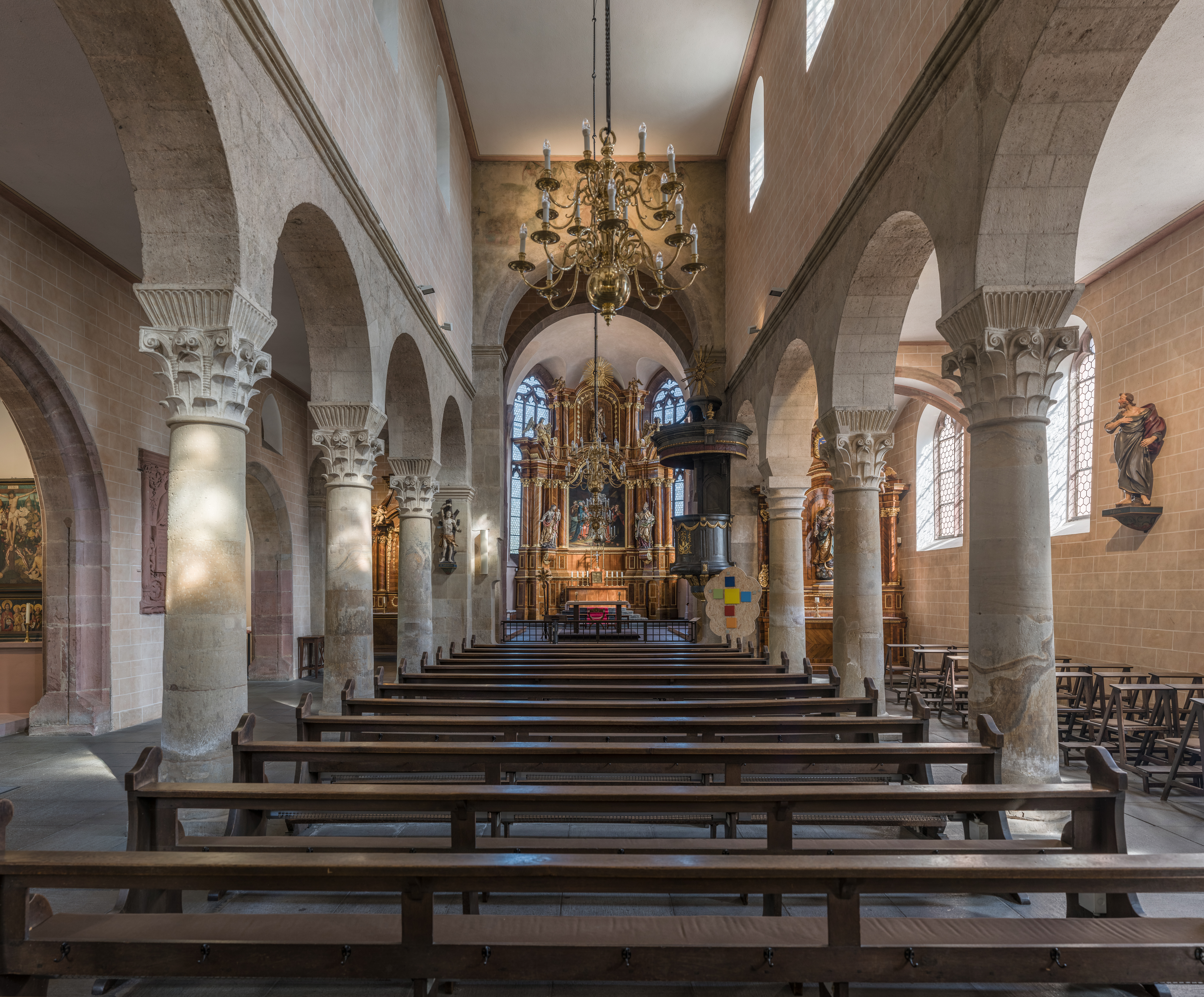
Nave looking towards choir

Due to the change in position of the entrance, a richly decorated pointed-arch north doorway was built in around 1442, which is flanked by statues of Paul of Thebes and Anthony the Great.

Construction which commenced in 1441 are the works of the so-called Frankfurt school, under the master builder Madern Gerthener. The most important builder in Höchst was Steffan von Irlebach, son-in-law of Gerthener, as well as the stonemason Peter Wale, who worked with Gerthener on the Frankfurt Cathedral tower.

== Garden ==
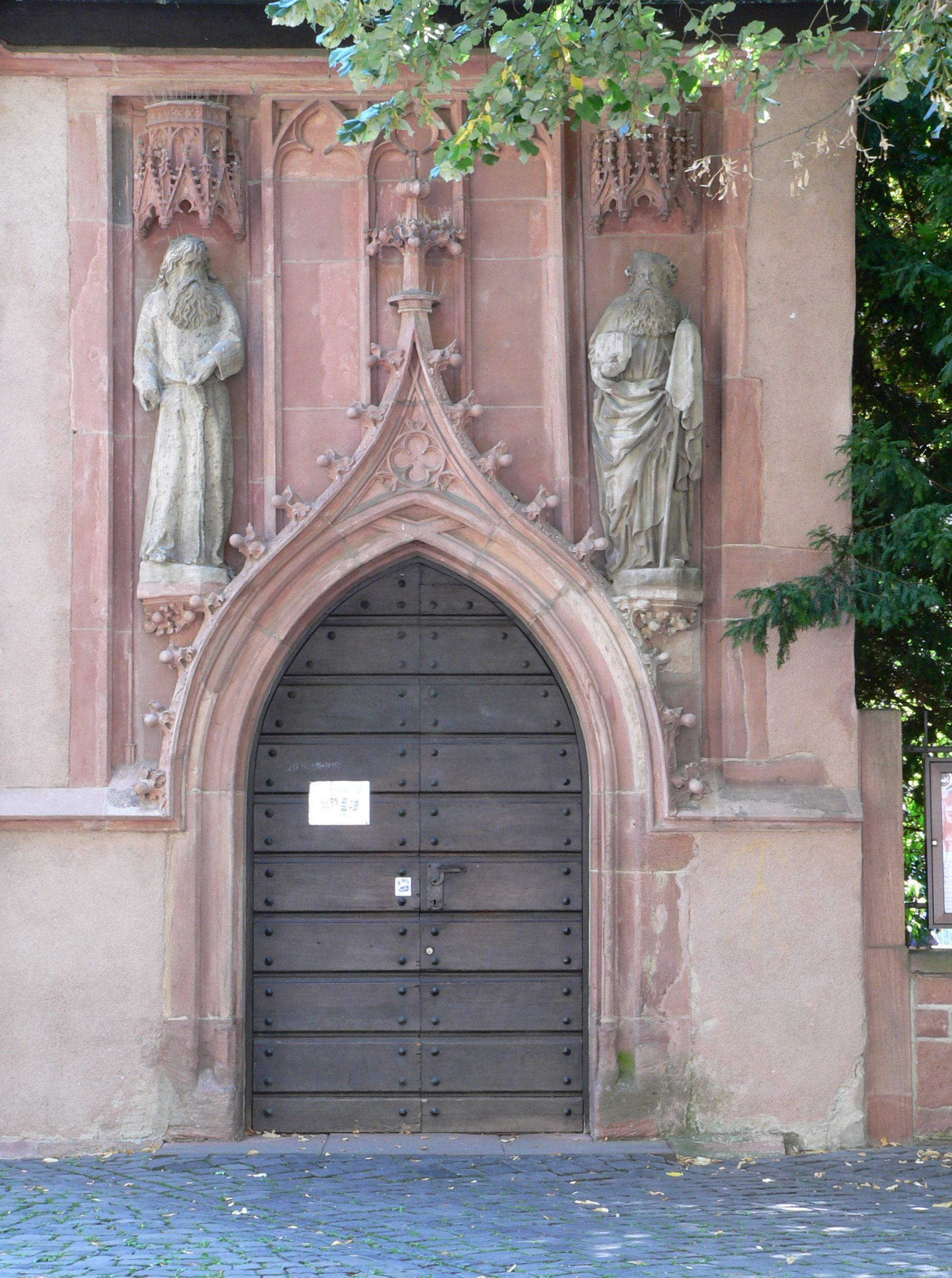
North doorway

The area around the Justinuskirche was the Höchst cemetery since the Middle Ages. Burials also took place in the church. Canons of the Antonite Order were buried there. The von Dalberg and von Kapp families had family tombs in the Justinuskirche.

The churchyard was abandoned in 1810. It was demolished between 1930 and 1932 during the renovation of the church and the square in front of the church was paved. Only a Pietà on the north facade of the church, eight grave slabs inside the church and some weathered gravestones in the garden on the Main side recall the burial place.

The garden of the Justinus Church, located on the Main River side, was created in its planting in the early 1990s. Here medicinal herbs used by the Antonites are cultivated. For the public the garden is accessible since 2004 from spring to autumn.

== Sources ==
- Metternich, Wolfgang: Justinuskirche Frankfurt/Höchst. Schnell Kunstführer Nr. 1215, Munich/Zurich, 1980.
- Metternich, Wolfgang: Die Justinuskirche in Frankfurt am Main. Ein Bauwerk von nationaler Bedeutung. Verlag Waldemar Kramer, Frankfurt am Main, 1987,
- Haberland, Ernst-Dietrich: Madern Gerthener "der stadt franckenfurd werkmeister". Baumeister und Bildhauer der Spätgotik. Knecht, Frankfurt, 1992.
- Prestel Städteführer Frankfurt am Main, Munich, 1990.

== External links (German) ==
- Church of St. Joseph
- St. Justin's Church
- Detailed representation St. Justin's Church with photos, sketches, historical reconstruction and bibliography.
- 360° panorama of St. Justin's
