= Hebertshausen station =

Railway station in Germany

Hebertshausen
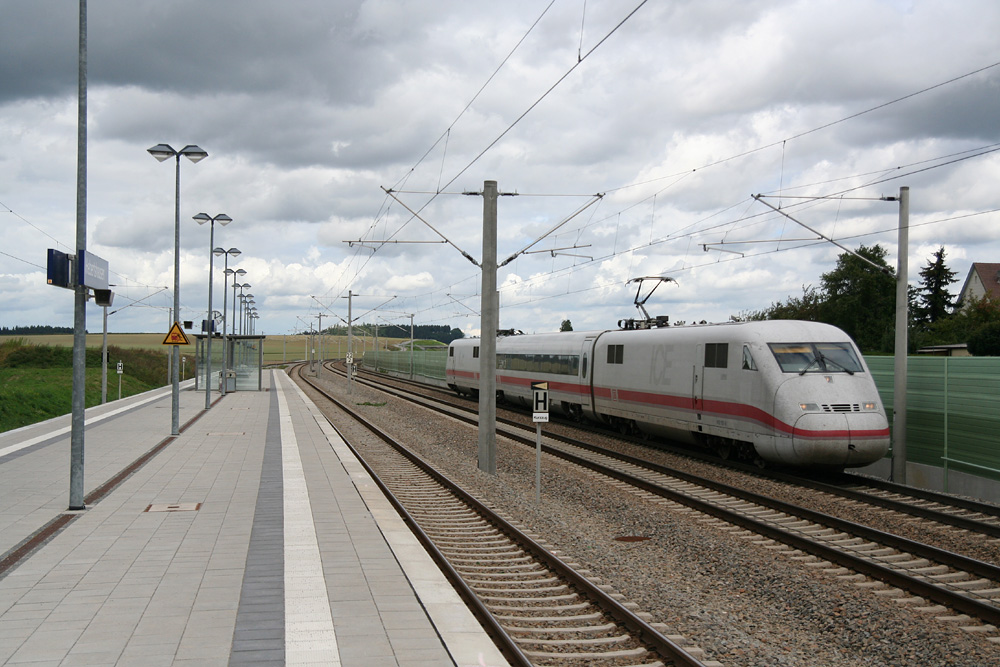
- 2006

General information
- Location: Bahnhofstraße/Adolf-Lieb-Straße; 85241 Hebertshausen; Bavaria; Germany
- Coordinates: 48.2912°N 11.4555°E
- Owner: DB Netz
- Operator: DB Station&Service
- Lines: Munich–Treuchtlingen railway (KBS 999.2)
- Platforms: 1 island platform
- Tracks: 2
- Train operators: S-Bahn München
- Connections: 723, 725, 7000, 7090

Other information
- Station code: 6515
- DS100 code: MHSN
- IBNR: 8006189
- Category: 5
- Fare zone: : 2
- Website: www.bahnhof.de

History
- Opened: 15 August 1891; 135 years ago

Services
Preceding station	Munich S-Bahn	Following station
Röhrmoos towards Petershausen	S2	Dachau Bahnhof towards Erding
Location
- Location within Bavaria Location within Germany Location within Europe

Hebertshausen station is a railway station in the municipality of Hebertshausen, located in the Dachau district in Upper Bavaria, Germany.

== Renaming ==
The station was renamed on 28 May 2000 from Walpertshofen to Hebertshausen. Walpertshofen is a district of the municipality of Hebertshausen.
