= Hitto =

Hitto may refer to:

- Hitto of Freising (died 835), Bavarian bishop
- Ghassan Hitto (born 1963), Syrian politician
- hitto, a mild piece of Finnish profanity
