= De natura rerum =

De natura rerum, De naturis rerum, etc. may refer to:

- De rerum natura, a didactic poem by Lucretius
- De natura rerum, a treatise by Isidore of Seville
- De natura rerum (Bede), a treatise by Bede
- De naturis rerum by Alexander Neckam
- De natura rerum (Cantimpré), a natural history by Thomas of Cantimpré

== See also ==
- De rerum naturis by Rabanus Maurus
