= Hebertshausen shooting range =

Shooting range at Dachau concentration camp

Coordinates: 48.2875°N 11.4610°E

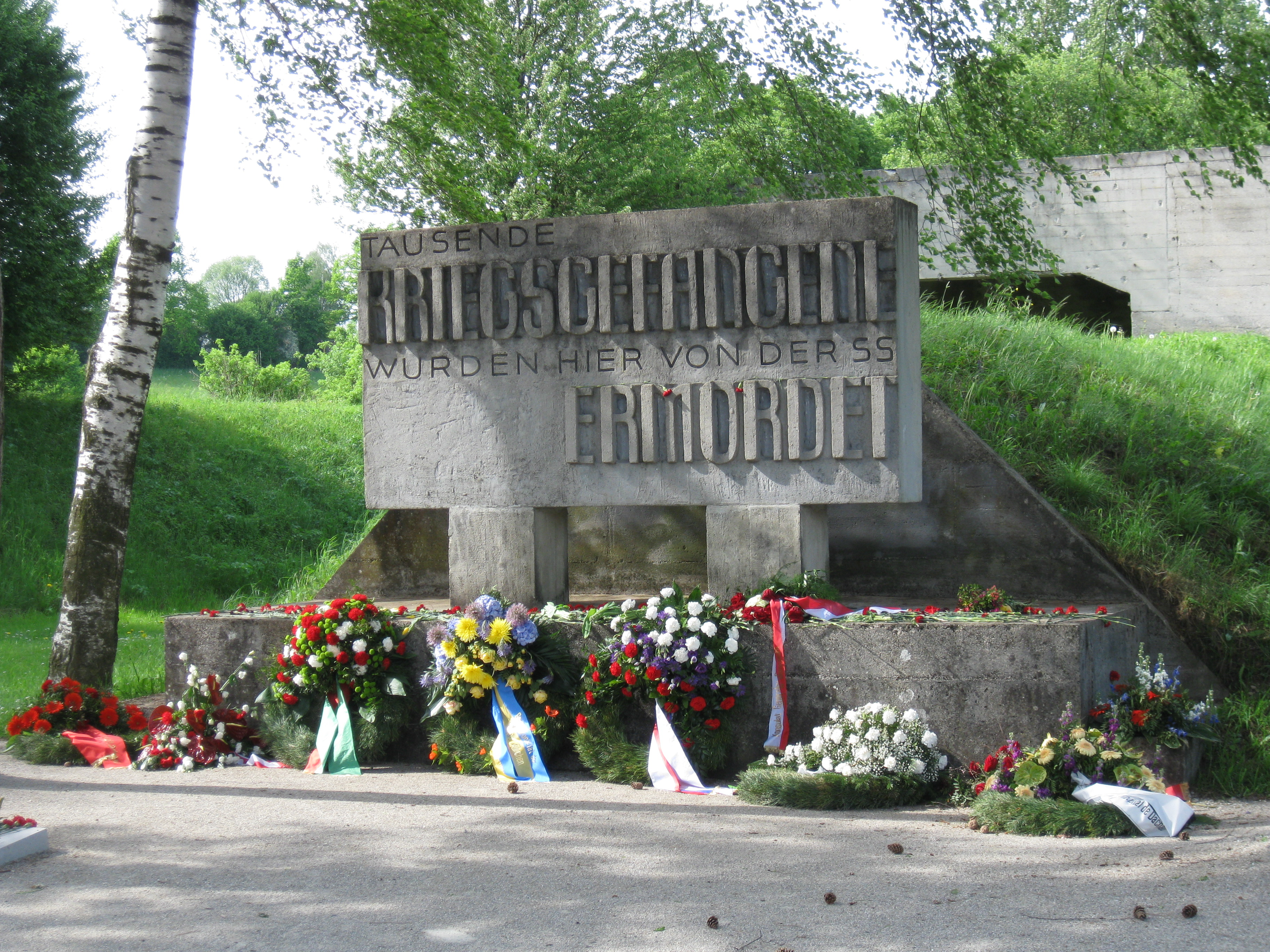
Memorial

Hebertshausen shooting range (German: Schießplatz Hebertshausen) was a shooting range at Dachau concentration camp, located two kilometres north of the Dachau main camp for SS guards that used Soviet live prisoners of war as targets. It was built in 1937-38 as an expansion to Dachau concentration camp. Between 1941 and 1942, more than 4,000 Soviet prisoners were murdered on the site. These were mainly officers, communist officials, and Jews. The victims were “singled out” according to ideological and racist criteria by Gestapo Einsatzkommandos in the POW camps of the military districts of Munich, Nuremberg, Stuttgart, Wiesbaden and Salzburg. After World War II, American troops assumed control of the site and continued to use it as a firing range. It is now a memorial to Nazi victims.

== Summary ==
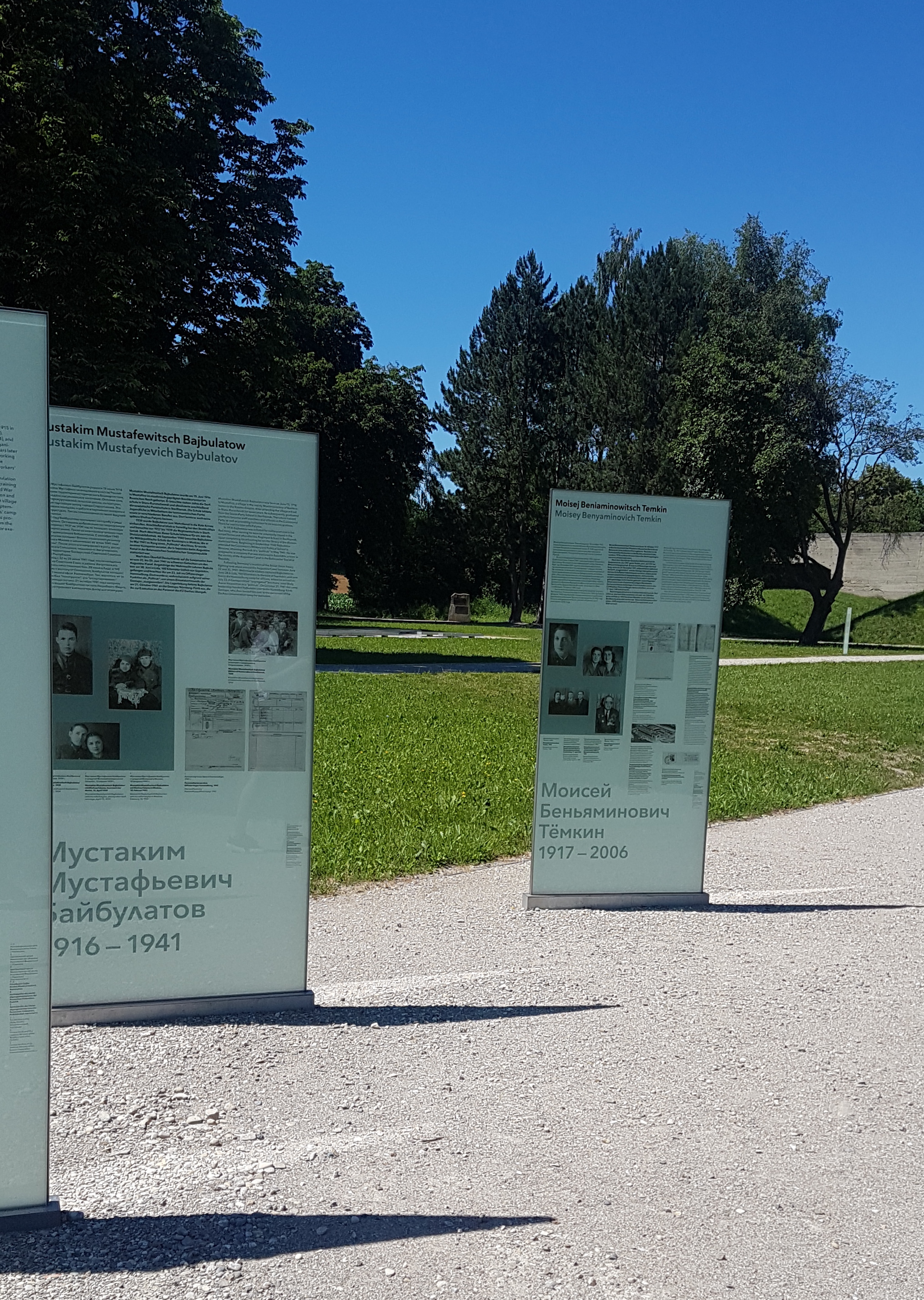
Memorial Shooting Range Hebertshausen

In the 1950s, the land was handed over to the Free State of Bavaria and administered by the Bavarian Ministry of Finance. Since 1997, the site has been in the care of the Foundation of Bavarian Memorial Places (German: Stiftung Bayerische Gedenkstätten), and in 2014, the Dachau Concentration Camp Memorial Site opened a redesigned memorial site upon the grounds.

== Establishment of the shooting range ==
According to Colonel General Franz Halder, Chief of Staff of the German Army High Command, Germany’s military campaign against Russia aimed, among other things, at the “destruction of the Bolshevik commissars and the Communist intelligence.” Fearing that the Soviet POWs held in camps on German territory could infiltrate the local population and spread communist propaganda, the SS, rather than the Wehrmacht, assumed control of Soviet POWs, in defiance of international law.

The “Commissar Order” (Einsatzbefehle) nos. 8 and 9—the so-called Commissar Order—issued by Reinhard Heydrich on 17 and 21 July 1941 to the Einsatzkommandos of the security police and the security service reveal the Nazi leadership’s intentions for Soviet POWs.

As stated in the Commissar Order no. 8, the aim was the “political review of all camp inmates (i.e., Soviet prisoners of war) and further treatment. Among the prisoners of war are all the important functionaries of the state and the party, especially the functionaries of the Comintern, all the authoritative party functionaries of the CPSU ... all people’s commissars ... all former political commissars in the Red Army, ... the leading personalities of economic life, the Soviet Russian intelligentsia, all Jews, all persons identified as agitators or fanatical communists.”

The Commissar Order no. 9 states, among other things, that the executions of the Russians who have been singled out in POW camps on Reich territory were to be carried out “inconspicuously in the nearest concentration camp.”

== Mass shootings in the Dachau Concentration Camp ==
=== Shootings in the bunker yard ===
The mass executions of Soviet POWs began in August and September 1941, after the Stapostelle Regensburg, among others, initiated the “selection” (Aussonderung) process in the weeks prior. This “selection” was based on the principle of denunciation, which was repeatedly “helped along” by torture. Soviet prisoners of war from the POW camps Hammelburg in the Rhön Mountains (higher officers and enlisted men), Nuremberg-Langwasser, Memmingen, Moosburg and the Stuttgart military districts were “selected” and taken to the Dachau concentration camp.

Gestapo agents accompanied these irregular transports to Dachau. About these transports, Paul Ohlers, head of one of the Einsatzkommandos, recounted that “the Russian prisoners of war were bound together with metal shackles, two men each, during the transport. The transports usually took place at night in the winter of 1941/42 and lasted an average of 12-18 hours. The cars were not heated.”

1 100 officers were brought to Dachau from the officer camp and approximately 2 000 from the enlisted men’s camps in Hammelburg and Nuremberg-Langwasser. Of those “selected” in the POW camps, none survived after being taken to Dachau. According to the instructions stipulated by the SS leadership in Dachau, the names of these POWs were not allowed to be registered in the camp list. Only the numbers of their identification tags could be noted. This procedure was designed to render it impossible to trace and identify these men. In order to keep the shootings secret, the prisoners working in the maintenance building and elsewhere in the vicinity were ordered back to the barracks during the executions which took place in the courtyard of the camp’s prison. The dead were cremated in the camp’s crematorium and in a crematorium in Munich.

=== Shootings at the SS Shooting Range near Hebertshausen ===
The SS feared it would be impossible to maintain the secrecy of the executions if they continued within the grounds of the concentration camp and thus transferred the executions to the practice shooting range near Hebertshausen, which lies approximately one and a half kilometers away from the concentration camp. The first executions at the shooting range took place on 4 September 1941 and the last in May and June 1942. Thereafter, additional executions were carried out near the camp’s crematorium. In total, approximately 4,000 Soviet POWs were executed in Dachau, the majority of them at the SS shooting range near Hebertshausen.

The actual location of the mass shootings was the pistol shooting range, which was surrounded by a high wooden fence to prevent observations from the surrounding fields.

According to the testimony of eye witness Joseph Thora, the prisoners were told beforehand that they were about to be murdered, which prompted diverse reactions amongst the prisoners. Some showed practically no reaction and “stood there as if paralyzed; others resisted, began to cry and scream ... that they were opponents of Bolshevism, that they were members of the Russian Church.”

While executions are normally aimed at a victim’s chest, the SS in some cases aimed at the victims’ heads, causing the heads to practically “explode.”

Coffins that were used to transport the bodies were stored in a shed built on the eastern edge of the shooting range. These coffins were used to transport the bodies to the camp crematorium and then brought back to the shooting range for reuse. The simple coffins were later lined with zinc sheets to prevent the leakage of blood.

Over the years after the war, human remains were found during the excavations on site in Hebertshausen. It is assumed that the triple number of excavated human skull parts is still in the ground today. The findings shocked and surprised the archaeologists at the same time. Because "typical" executions were usually aimed at the chest. But even the head would only have been pierced with the high-speed projectiles used at that time, but not splintered. An investigation in the Anthropological State Collection in Munich by Olav Röhrer-Ertl then showed "that at least part of the shootings were carried out with increased cruelty."

== Ideological intent of the shootings and reactions of the SS ==
The executions served as an education in cruelty for the SS-men as they witnessed and perpetrated “a tremendous bloodbath,” as the shots to the head sent blood and brain mass splashing for meters around. The shootings were intended to “harden” the SS and inure them for the worst, preparing them to execute even the toughest commands without contradiction. In addition, these actions were designed to tie the SS-men to the regime through complicity and thus establish a “community” of perpetrators.

After the executions, a number of SS-men became depressed and mentally stressed. In order to increase motivation, the SS leadership offered “rewards” consisting of special promotions, schnapps and cigarettes, snacks (Brotzeit), days off duty, medals (War Merit Cross Second Class, with swords), and for particularly dedicated SS-men, holidays in Italy.

According to his memoirs, a man whose father was an SS guard in the Dachau concentration camp regards the membership of one of his closest family members to the SS Guards (SS-Wachmannschaft) as a completely normal profession as any other. It was not until many years later that he began to doubt the innocence of his father and the harmlessness of his professional activities. During a visit to the memorial site of the former “SS-Schießplatz Hebertshausen,” he read on an information board that SS men involved in firing squads were able to go on holiday in Italy in the summer of 1942 as a “reward.” Interestingly, he stated in an interview that, he was not sure, but there exist photos of his father vacationing in Palermo and Naples. Nevertheless, he repressed these doubts once again. He is convinced that his father was sentenced to eight years in prison “only” for slapping a prisoner who had repeatedly violated the camp regulations. He regards the sentence as a great injustice.

A total of 190 members of the Kommandanturstab and other men from the guards of the Dachau concentration camp were among the perpetrators. As the research in the book published in 2020 shows, some of SS men were proud of their role in the mass murder of Soviet prisoners of war. "Tomorrow we will have a shooting party again," one of them said. Hardly any of the perpetrators had to answer to court after 1945. Egon Zill, Schutzhaftlagerführer in the concentration camp, was sentenced to life imprisonment in 1955, but was released after eight years.

== State of research on the Soviet prisoners of war ==
According to the prevailing consensus of historical research, many Soviet POWs were not registered upon arrival in Dachau, especially in 1941/42, due to an ideological indifference to their fates or to the predetermined intention to exterminate them. Consequently, these prisoners lived in a space free from legal constraints. There was no accountability for their deaths, because in formal terms, they did not exist at all. The deaths of many Soviet soldiers were simply not recorded; they were simply buried in mass graves so that, in contrast to the deceased of other nations, it was impossible to identify their whereabouts and burial location after the war. Thus, an unknown but extremely high number of dead rest in Soviet war graves in Germany.

Nonetheless, with a few exceptions, all Soviet POWs were in fact registered on so-called staff cards in the POW camps as soon as they were brought into the German Reich. On these cards, all their personal and military data (places of work, illnesses and hospitalizations, vaccinations, escapes, punishments, etc.) was recorded. This information was submitted in the form of acquisition lists to the Wehrmacht Information Office (WASt) in Berlin. In the event of death, these personnel cards were sent to Berlin together with other documents (identification tags, proof of death, lists recording a decrease in prisoners, etc.) so that the WASt had an overview at all times of all deceased POWs, including those who had been delivered to the SS and murdered in Dachau. These documents, as well as other items related to the prisoners, were outsourced to Meiningen in 1943 and handed over to the Soviet troops in 1945; since then they have been considered lost.

Historians Dr. Reinhard Otto and Rolf Keller succeeded in locating these card index documents; some fragments lie in the German Information Office (Deutsche Dienststelle) in Berlin, the successor of the WASt. The great majority, however, lie in the archive of the Ministry of Defense of the Russian Federation in Podolsk (ZAMO); Otto and Keller subjected these documents to an initial review over a period of several visits.

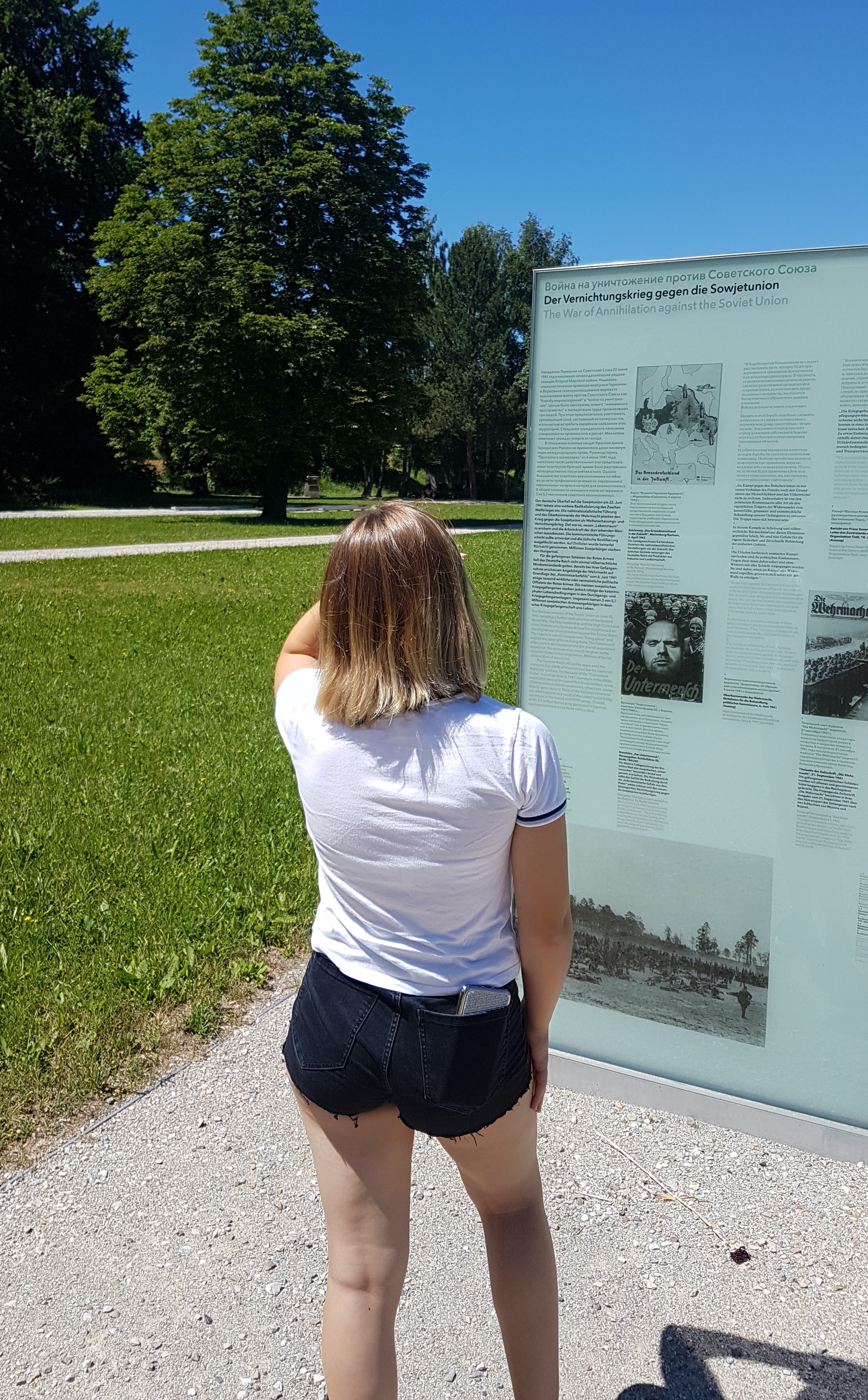

They discovered that the personnel cards of the Soviet soldiers who died in the Reich (approx. 370,000) can be found in their entirety in this archive, in addition to other card documents, reports of hospital stays, lists of transports to and from the POW camps, and lists of deceased persons. There is also a separate card index of 80,000 officers. Via the personnel cards, extensive transfers between the various concentration camps can also be traced. At any rate, the file documents provide detailed evidence of the whereabouts of each prisoner.

These documents were torn out of their original arrangement after the war and were arbitrarily bound together into new volumes of files, each containing approximately 100 index cards. They are organized neither alphabetically nor according to camps. Rather, the officers’ card index has been rearranged according to the Russian alphabet.

The Dachau Concentration Camp Memorial Site estimates that between 1500 and 2000 names of victims who were murdered in Hebertshausen can be identified over the long term. Currently, 816 names are listed on the memorial installation in Hebertshausen.

=== First Public Announcement of Names in "Komsomolskaya Pravda" ===
On January 16, 2014, the Russian newspaper “Komsomolskaya Pravda” published a list of 62 Soviet prisoners of war who were shot at the SS shooting range in Hebertshausen, a publication that generated a flood of feedback. Several readers learned the cruel truth about their relatives’ fates for the first time in seventy-two years. So a daughter who has been trying to find the traces of her father, Leonid Nikolaevich Bushkov, ever since he was drafted to the army in 1941 before she was born, found out the truth about her father's death.

== SS shooting range Hebertshausen after the war ==
American troops took possession of the more than 8 ha. large grounds after World War II and continued to use the site as a firing range. In the 1950s, the site was handed over to the Free State of Bavaria and administered by the Ministry of Finance, which apparently had the intention of letting the history of the site fall into oblivion.

In 1964, a memorial stone created by the artist Will Elfers and donated by the Dachau Camp Community (Lagergemeinschaft Dachau) was set up in front of the bullet traps. After a short time there, the Ministry of Finance transferred this memorial to the entrance gate of the shooting range.

For many years, this brutal crime was suppressed from public view due to the East-West conflict, the annexation of Crimea and the political tensions in relation to Putin's Russia.

It was only in 1997 that a group of committed citizens succeeded in halting the state-sponsored policy of forgetting and repression. The Ministry of Finance ultimately responded to the pressure and transferred the site to the Ministry of Culture, which placed the site under the care of the State Headquarters for Political Education (Landeszentrale für politische Bildungsarbeit). Will Elfers’ four-ton-heavy memorial stone was moved back to its original place of installation, a clear sign that state policy toward the memorial site of the former SS-Shooting Range Hebertshausen had changed.

On June 22, 2011 the human remains found during the excavations were buried in a small wooden box in front of the memorial stone, in a multi-religious celebration with prayers.

On May 2, 2014 the Dachau Concentration Camp Memorial Site opened a redesigned memorial site upon the grounds. Since then, several information boards have been erected on the site to inform visitors about its history in several languages. The installation measures forty meters in length, providing enough space to list all the names of the estimated 4,000 victims. The Dachau Concentration Camp Memorial Site projects that 1,500 to 2,000 names can be identified in the long term. As of June 2020, there are currently 816 names on the installation.

The Munich-based Consulate General of the Russian Federation and the Consulate General of Ukraine both now recognize the former SS-Shooting Range Hebertshausen as a memorial site for their fallen soldiers. Annual memorial ceremonies take place at the site on the anniversary of Operation Barbarossa (June 22), the day Nazi Germany attacked the Soviet Union in 1941. In addition, yearly ceremonies are held at the site to commemorate the anniversary of the liberation of the Dachau concentration camp (April 29).

Next to the memorial site lies the former SS-guardhouse, which the city of Dachau has transformed into a homeless shelter.
