= Vierkirchen-Esterhofen station =

Railway station in Upper Bavaria, Germany

Vierkirchen-Esterhofen
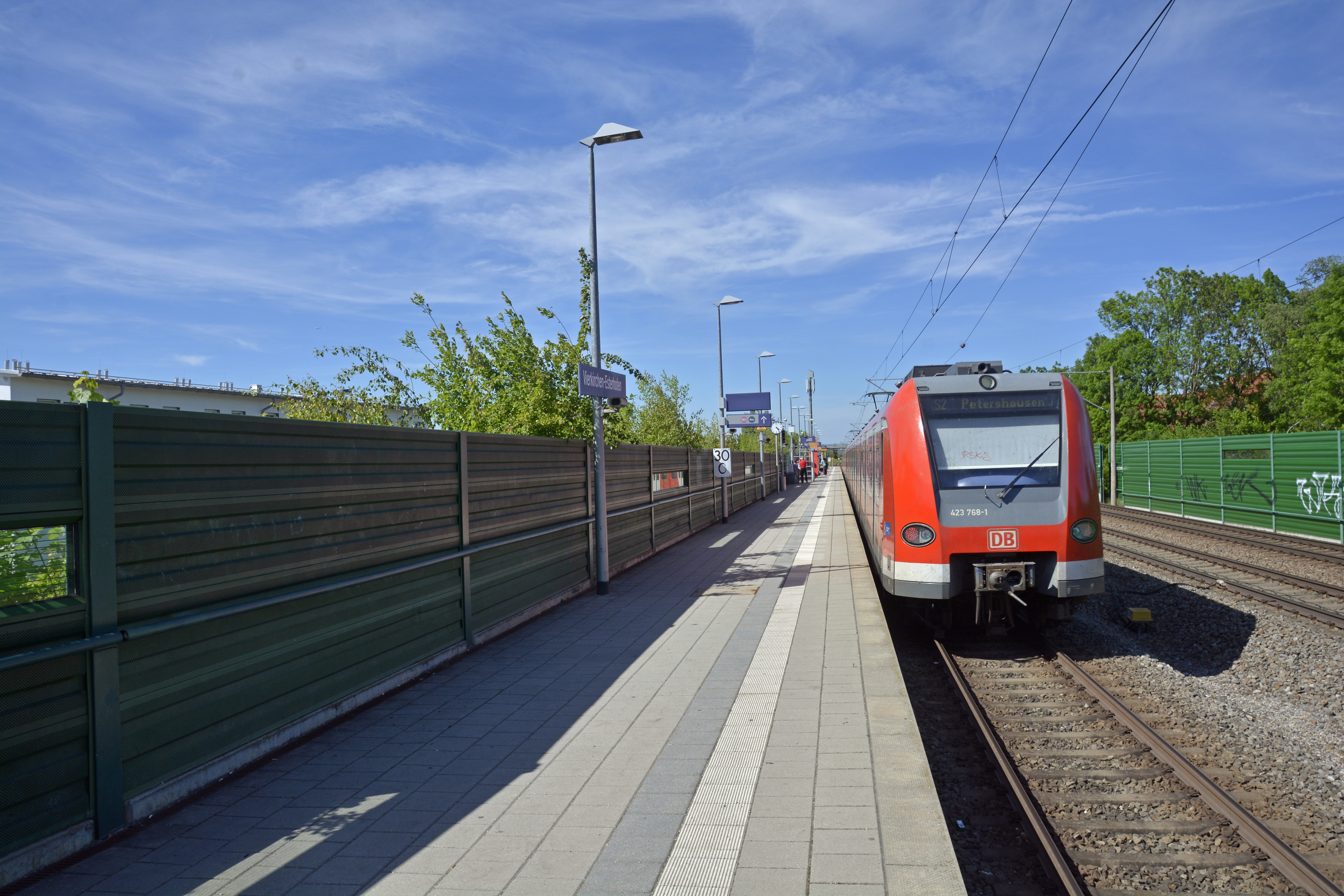
- 2019

General information
- Location: Schloßstraße 29; 85256 Vierkirchen; Bavaria; Germany
- Coordinates: 48.3611°N 11.4451°E
- Owner: Deutsche Bahn
- Operator: DB Station&Service
- Lines: Munich–Treuchtlingen railway (KBS 999.2)
- Platforms: 1 side platform
- Tracks: 1
- Train operators: S-Bahn München
- Connections: 708, 729, 7010

Other information
- Station code: 1719
- DS100 code: MESH
- IBNR: 8001922
- Category: 5
- Fare zone: : 3 and 4
- Website: www.bahnhof.de

History
- Opened: 1 June 1898; 128 years ago

Services
Preceding station	Munich S-Bahn	Following station
Petershausen Terminus	S2	Röhrmoos towards Erding
Location

Vierkirchen-Esterhofen station is a railway station in the municipality of Vierkirchen, located in the Dachau district in Upper Bavaria, Germany.

== Renaming ==
The station was renamed on 28 May 2000 from Esterhofen to Vierkirchen-Esterhofen. Esterhofen is a district of the municipality of Vierkirchen.
