= Vierkirchen =

- Municipality
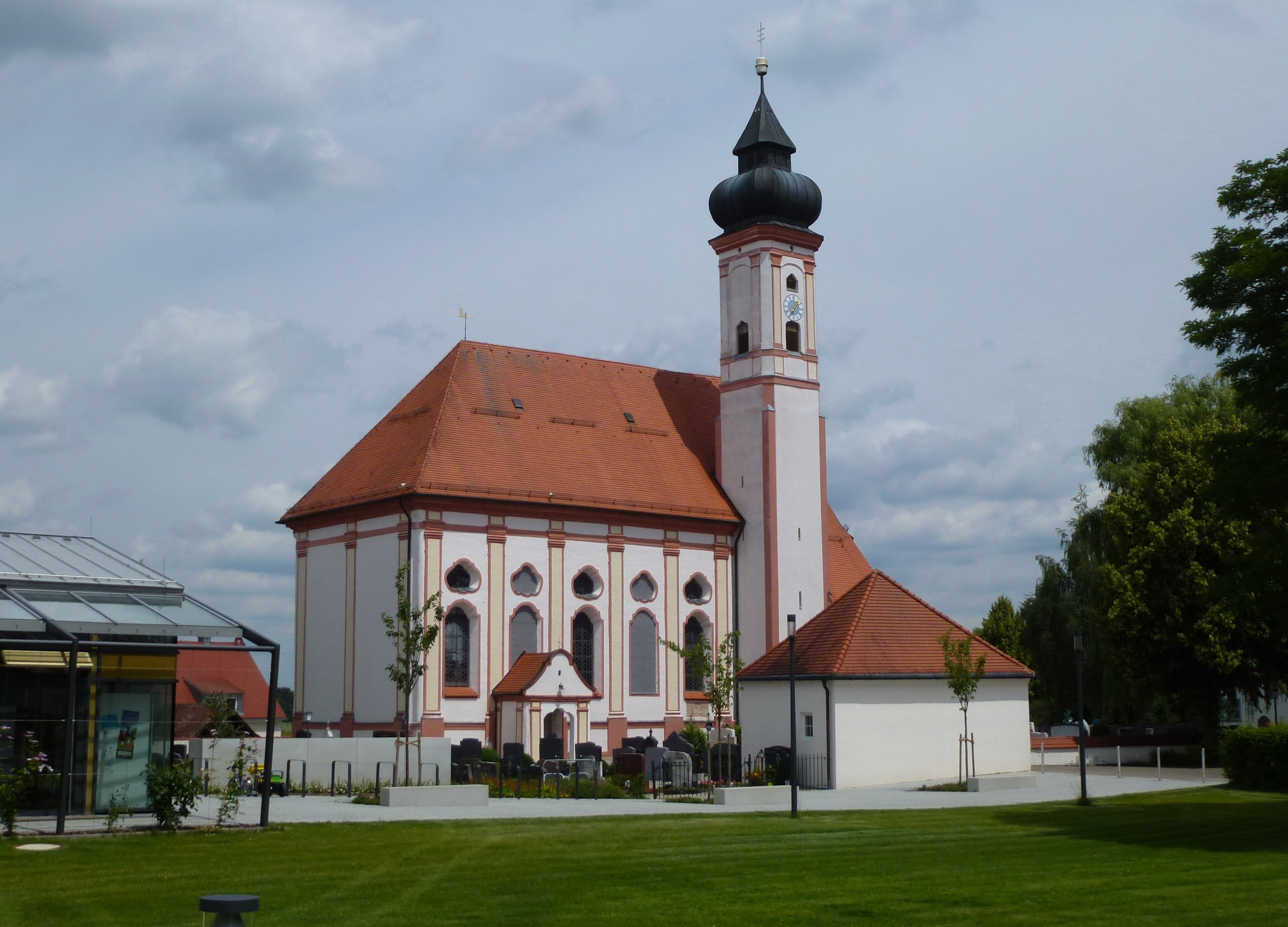
- Church of Saint Jakobus

- Coat of arms

- Location of Vierkirchen within Dachau district
- Interactive map of Vierkirchen
- Location within Germany Location within Bavaria
- Coordinates: 48°22′N 11°28′E
- Country: Germany
- State: Bavaria
- Admin. region: Oberbayern
- District: Dachau
- Subdivisions: 13 Ortsteile

Government
  - Mayor (2026–32): Harald Dirlenbach (SPD)

Area
  - Total: 19.39 km^{2} (7.49 sq mi)
- Elevation: 490 m (1,610 ft)

Population (2025-12-31)
  - Total: 4,628
  - Density: 238.7/km^{2} (618.2/sq mi)
- Time zone: UTC+01:00 (CET)
  - Summer (DST): UTC+02:00 (CEST)
- Postal codes: 85256
- Dialling codes: 08139
- Vehicle registration: DAH
- Website: www.vierkirchen.de

Vierkirchen is a municipality in the district of Dachau in Bavaria in Germany.

== Meaning of town name ==
The name Vierkirchen (transl. 'four-churches') is a misnomer. There were never four churches in the village, only one (St. Jakobus). The name is most-likey a variation of the old-Bavarian dialect in the Middle Ages. Various names of Feohtkiricha, Feochtkyricha, Fichtkiriha and Viechtkirchen can be found in old church archives. These names suggest the original spruce wood (Fichten) church as the namesake.

== History ==
The boundaries of a parish in Vierkirchen were said to have been established around AD 779 under Bishop Aribo of Freising. Vierkirchen is first mentioned in a church record in 820 AD. A layman named Reginhelm comes to Vierkirchen, where Bishop Hitto von Freising is apparently holding a large meeting. This Reginhelm hands over the property of his dying uncle Kaganhart to the bishop. At the same time he transfers the little son of Kaganhart to the bishop for protection and for spiritual education. Other sizable donations are recorded in Vierkirchn in 823 and the mentioning of a church in 828. In addition, a noble family in 'Viechkirchen' are recorded in the Indersdorfer documents between 1150 and 1160. A 'Dietrich der Vichtkircher' was a judge in Kranzberg in 1375, and an 'Isegrim de Viechkirchen' can also be read. The coat of arms of these nobles reflects today's municipal coat of arms, (stork head and neck).

By 1440 the nearby village of Pasenbach had a court with a small castle. The castle was destroyed by the Swedes in 1632 during the Thirty Years War. The castle was rebuilt after the war in 1662. By the 19th century the property passed through several hands and by the 1840s it was demolished.

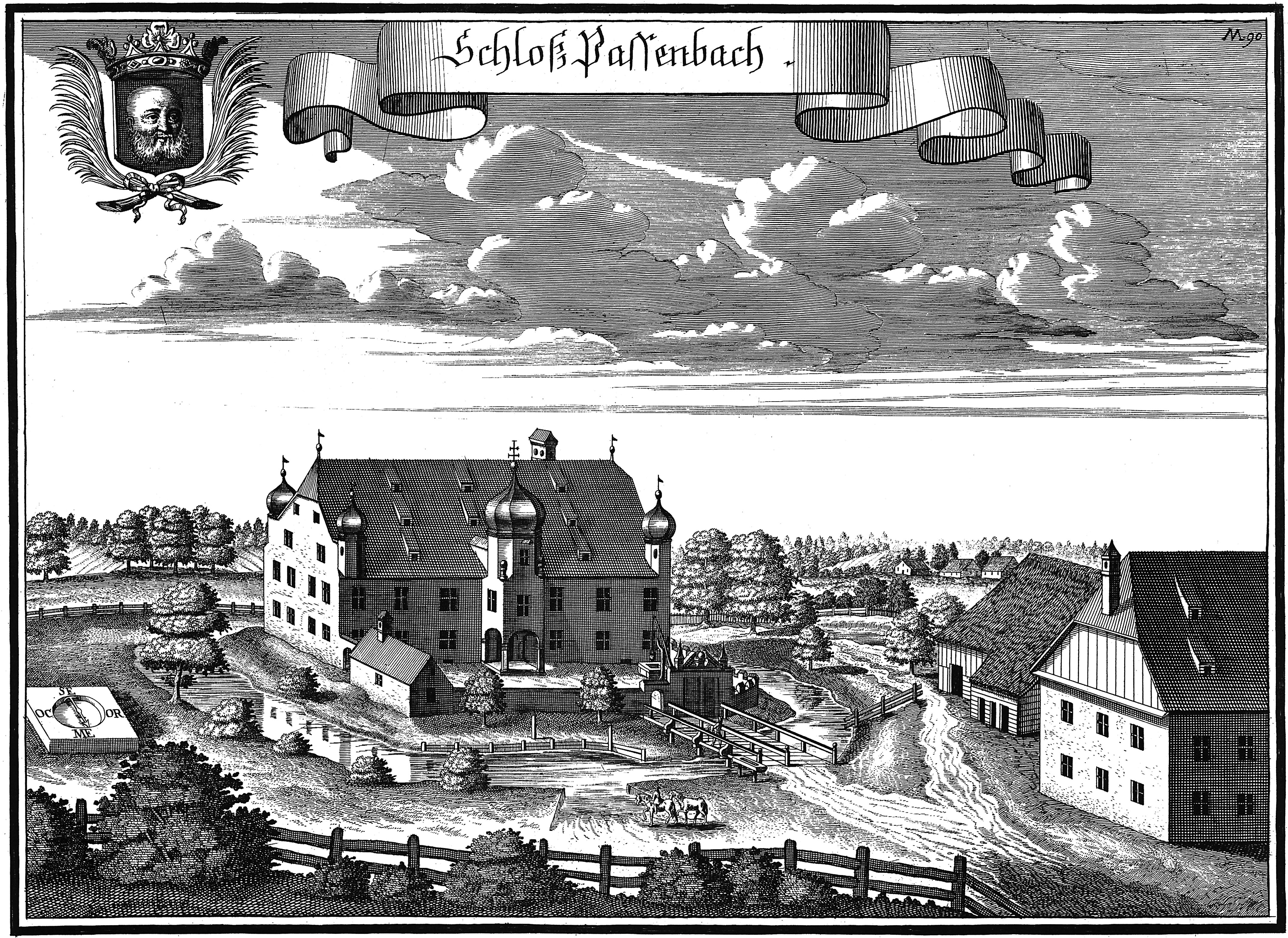
Castle Pasenbach (Image ca. 1700)

The current parish church in its present form, St. Jacob, was built from 1763/65 after the old Gothic church collapsed in 1759 due to dilapidation.

Vierkirchen became a political community by 1808 under the Kingdom of Bavaria. At that time the town had about 350 inhabitants, consisting mainly of farmers and handworkers.

In 1867 the Munich-Ingolstadt railway line was built through Vierkirchen (Pasenbach-Esterhofen).

After the Second World War, Vierkirchen remained as a municipality in the rural area of the Dachau region. Its population was about 1041 people.

In the 1972 Bavarian regional reforms, several villages were merged into the community of Vierkirchen, (such as Giebing, Pasenbach, Ramelsbach and Rettenbach).

In 1979 the community celebrated its 1200th anniversary. The community wanted to celebrate 1200 years of the first mentioning of its church in 2020. However celebrations were hampered due to the COVID-19 pandemic in Germany.

In 1999/2000 a partnership with the Italian municipality of Genazzano (about 50 km or 30 miles east of Rome) was formed.

== Politics, Industry and Sport ==
Since 1972, Vierkirchen is part of the Munich S-Bahn commuter line.

The current mayor (Bürgermeister) of Vierkirchen is Harald Dirlenbach (SPD) since 2014.

In the early 2000s, a small industry park was built between Vierkirchen and Pasenbach. It houses several businesses such as Hanwag and Andritz AG.

Vierkirchen has a sports club: SC Vierkirchen e. V.

A natural swimming pool (2,000 m^{2} or 22,000 sq ft) has existed in Vierkirchen since 2003.
