= Saint Alban's Abbey, Mainz =

Former abbey in Mainz, Germany

Coordinates: 49°59′24″N 8°16′48″E

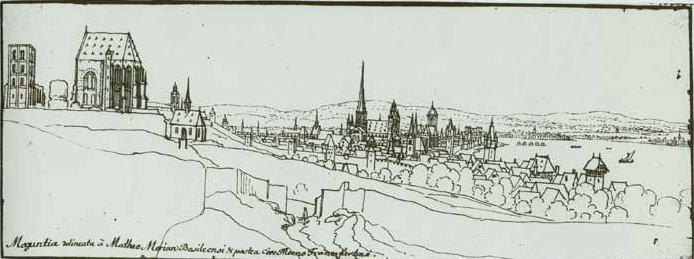
Mainz from the southeast, St. Alban's at left with choir and tower, next to the Drusus cenotaph, by Wenzel Hollar, 1631.

St. Alban's Abbey, Mainz (Stift St. Alban vor Mainz) originated as a Benedictine abbey, founded in 787 or 796 by Archbishop Richulf (787–813) in honour of Saint Alban of Mainz, located to the south of Mainz on the hill later called the Albansberg. It was turned into a collegiate foundation.(Herrenstift) in 1442. The buildings were entirely destroyed in 1552, The foundation retained a legal existence until its formal dissolution in 1802.

== History ==
The Stift St. Alban vor Mainz originated as a Benedictine abbey, founded in 787 or 796 by Archbishop Richulf (787–813) in honour of Saint Alban of Mainz. The abbey was founded near the basilica of Saint Alban founded in 413 and developed as part of the Carolingian Renaissance.

In 805 the Carolingian Basilica was consecrated, comprising three naves, but possibly originally without the transept and the two apses. At the western end was a hall the same size as the main nave, above which was a chapel of St. Michael. The two western towers, known from later illustrations, were added in the Romanesque period. The Gothic choir erected between 1300 and 1500, was extraordinarily large. The floor plan of Schloss Johannisberg, originally built as a monastery, reflects a similar construction, because St. Alban's was its mother house. The abbey kept the relics of St. Caesarius of Terracina, and in 1298 acquired those of Justin the Confessor from Saint Justin's Church in Höchst.

== Fortification ==
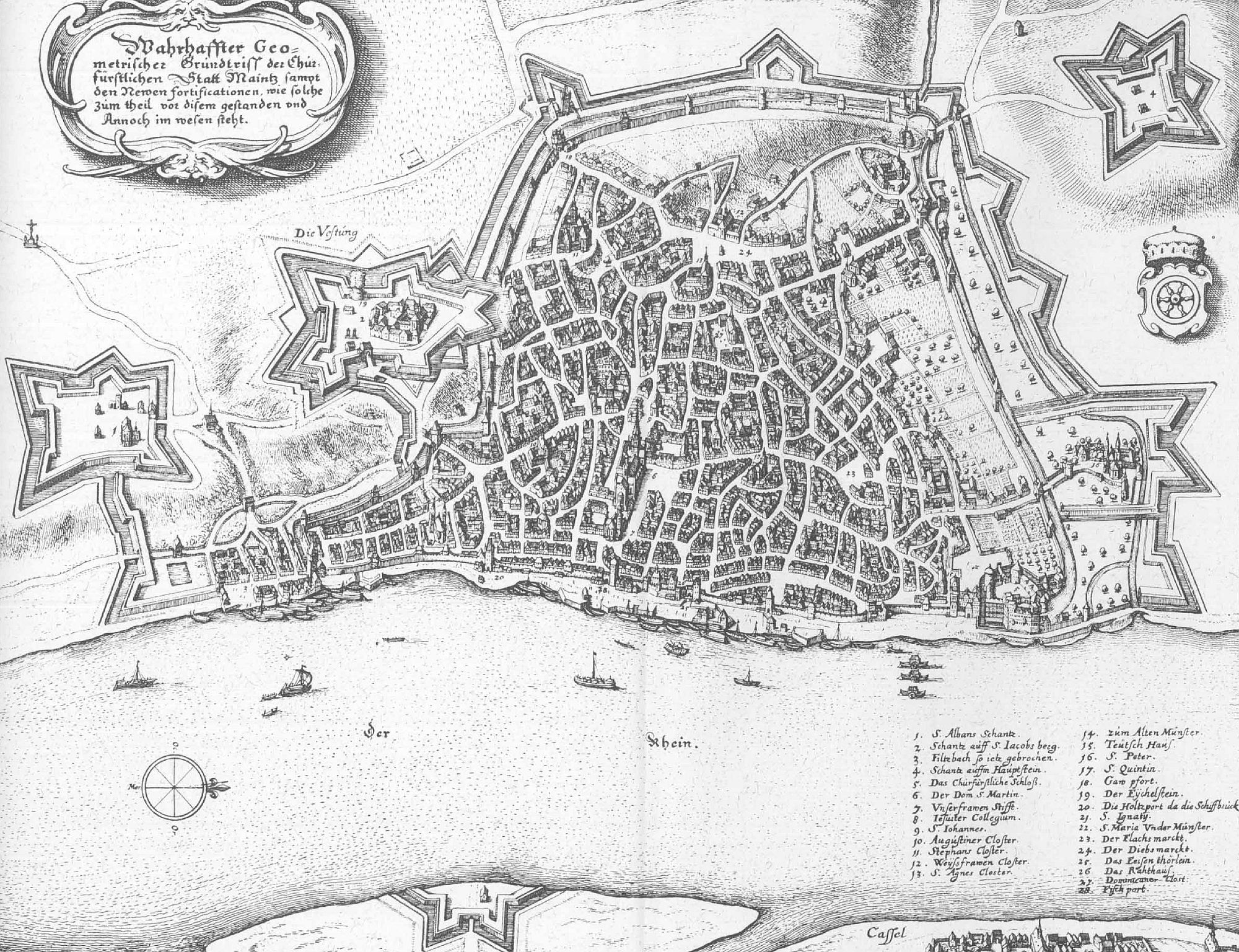
Mainz with St. Alban's Abbey to the east (on the left side), engraved by Matthäus Merian, 1655.

The later Archbishop of Mainz (1328–1336) Baldwin of Luxembourg fortified the abbeys of St. Alban's, St. Jakob's and St. Victor's, which at that period were located outside the town walls.

== Destruction ==
St. Alban's was sacked and burnt down on the evening of 28 August 1552 during the Second Margrave War by Albert Alcibiades, Margrave of Brandenburg-Kulmbach. It was not rebuilt. In 1802 St. Alban's Abbey, which until then had retained a nominal existence, was formally dissolved under Napoleon.

== Burials ==
- Fastrada (d. 794), fourth wife of Charlemagne.
- Charles of Aquitaine (d. 863), Archbishop of Mainz from 856 to 863.
- Liutgard of Saxony (died 953), daughter of Emperor Otto I.
- Liudolf (d. 957), Duke of Swabia and first son of Otto.
- William, Archbishop of Mainz (d. 968).

== Sources ==
- Reinhard Schmidt: Die Abtei St. Alban vor Mainz im hohen und späten Mittelalter. Geschichte, Verfassung und Besitz eines Klosters im Spannungsfeld zwischen Erzbischof, Stadt, Kurie und Reich. (Beiträge zur Geschichte der Stadt Mainz) (Mainz 1996)
- Brigitte Oberle: Das Stift St. Alban vor Mainz. Aspekte der Umwandlung des Benediktinerklosters St. Alban in ein Ritterstift im 15. Jahrhundert. (2005)
- Les Ordines Romani du haut moyen âge, Michel Andrieu, Louvain: Spicilegium Sacrum Lovaniense Administration, 1961–1974.
- Le Pontifical romano-germanique du dixième siècle, ed. C. Vogel and R. Elze (Studi e Testi vols. 226–7 (text), 266 (introduction and indices), 3 vols., Rome, 1963–72).
