= Röhrmoos station =

Railway station in Germany

Röhrmoos
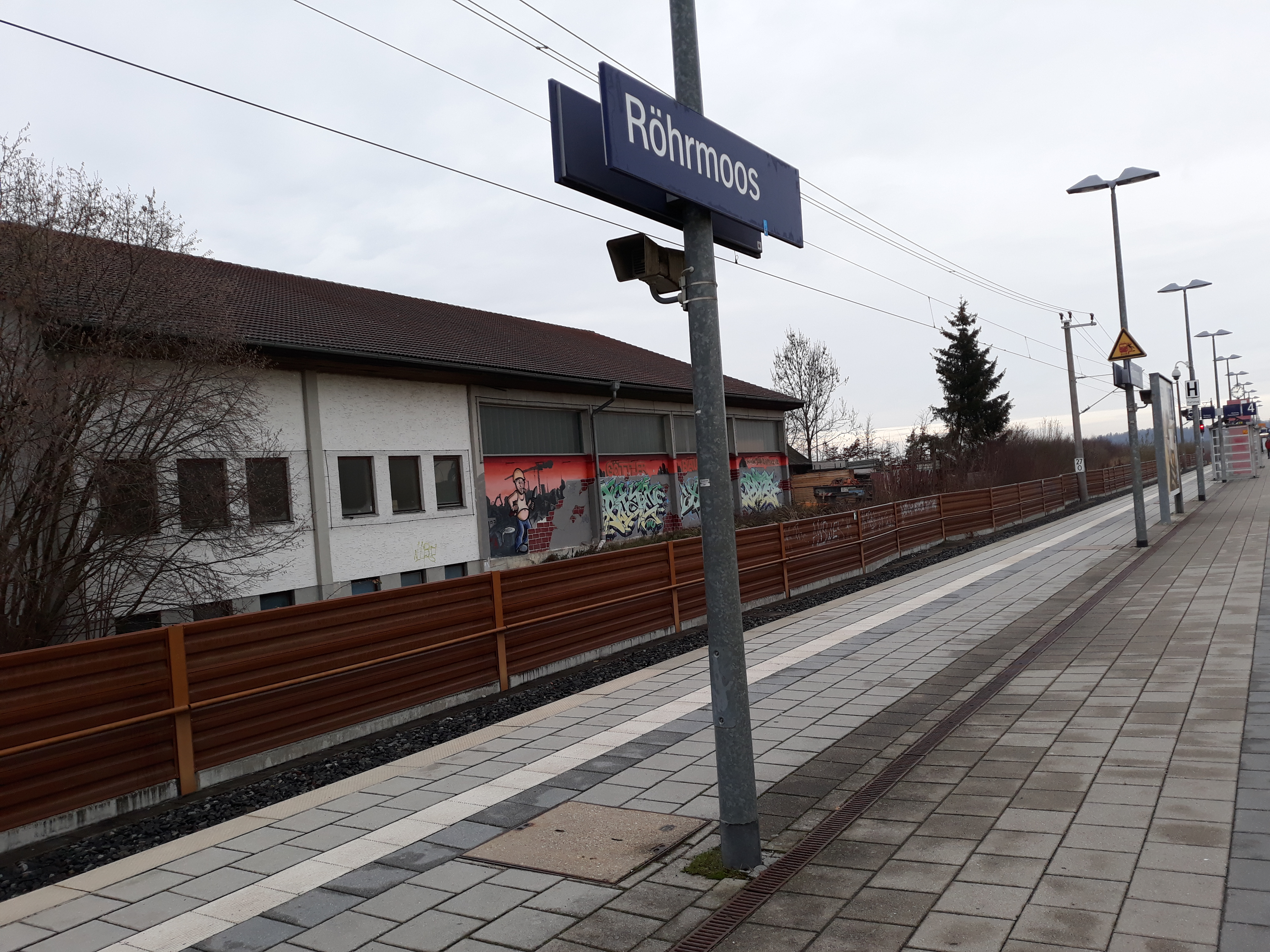
- 2018

General information
- Location: Bahnhofstraße 3; 85244 Röhrmoos; Bavaria; Germany
- Coordinates: 48.3339°N 11.4446°E
- Elevation: 493 m (1,617 ft)
- System: Hp
- Owner: DB Netz
- Operator: DB Station&Service
- Lines: Munich–Treuchtlingen railway (KBS 999.2)
- Platforms: 1 island platform
- Tracks: 2
- Train operators: S-Bahn München
- Connections: 727, 772, 7090, 7270

Other information
- Station code: 5323
- DS100 code: MRM; MRMS
- IBNR: 8005127
- Category: 5
- Fare zone: : 3
- Website: www.bahnhof.de

History
- Opened: 14 November 1867; 158 years ago

Services
Preceding station	Munich S-Bahn	Following station
Vierkirchen-Esterhofen towards Petershausen	S2	Hebertshausen towards Erding
Location
- Location within Bavaria Location within Germany Location within Europe

Röhrmoos station is a railway station in the municipality of Röhrmoos, located in the Dachau district in Upper Bavaria, Germany.
