= Rabanus Maurus =

Archbishop of Mainz and writer (d. 856)

Saint Rabanus Maurus
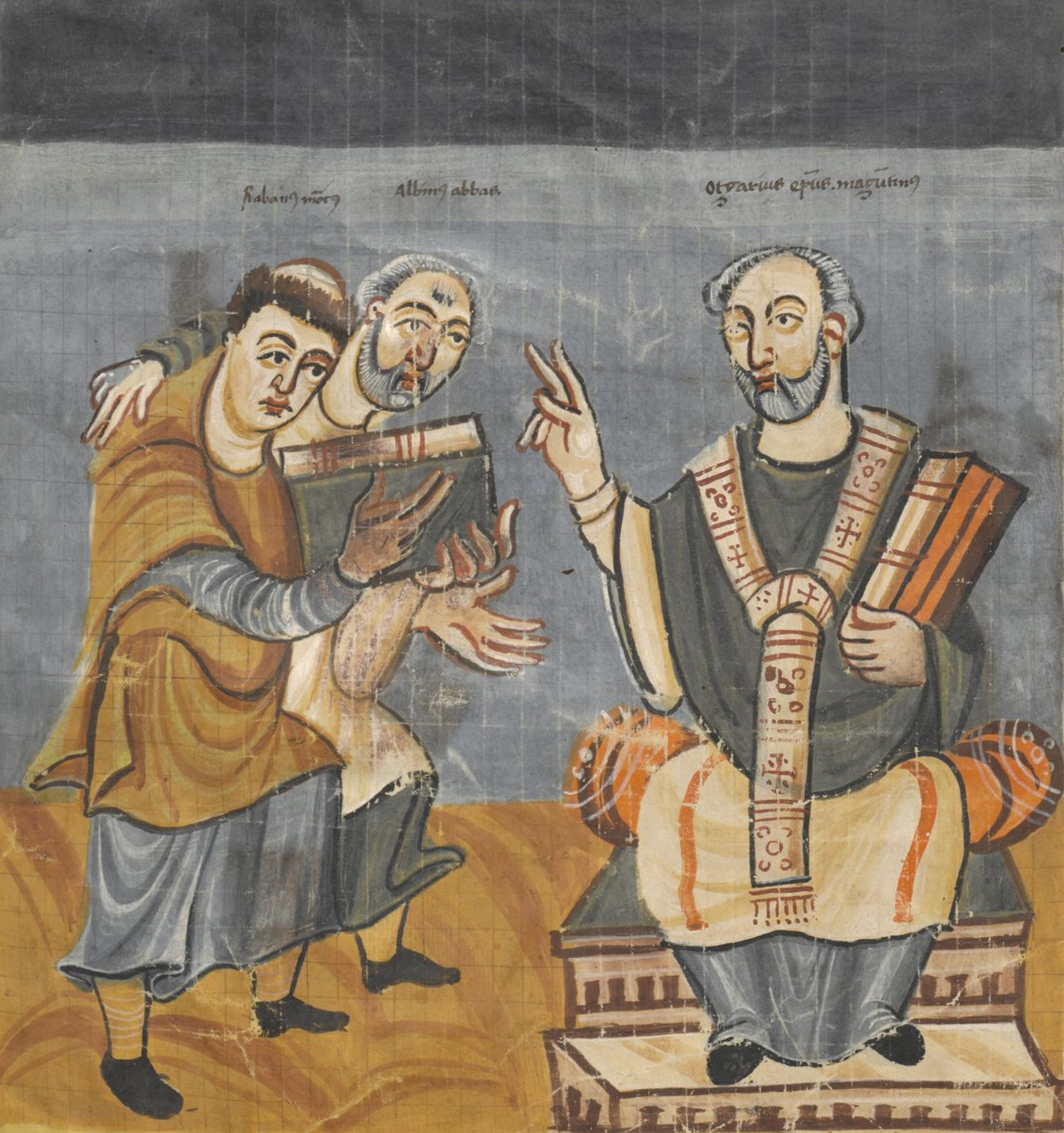
- Rabanus Maurus (left) with Alcuin presents his work to Otgar of Mainz (right). Illustration from a Fulda manuscript, c. 830–840.

Archbishop of Mainz Monk Missionary
- Born: c. 780; Mainz
- Died: 4 February 856 (aged 75–76); Winkel
- Venerated in: Catholic Church; Eastern Orthodox Church
- Feast: 4 February
- Influences: Alcuin

Rabanus Maurus Magnentius (c. 780 – 4 February 856), also known as Hrabanus or Rhabanus, was a Frankish Benedictine monk, theologian, poet, encyclopedist and military writer who became archbishop of Mainz in East Francia. He was the author of the encyclopaedia De rerum naturis ("On the Natures of Things"). He also wrote treatises on education and grammar and commentaries on the Bible. He was one of the most prominent teachers and writers of the Carolingian age, and was called "Praeceptor Germaniae", or "the teacher of Germany". In the most recent edition of the Roman Martyrology (Martyrologium Romanum, 2004, p. 133), his feast is given as 4 February and he is qualified as a Saint ('sanctus').

== Life ==
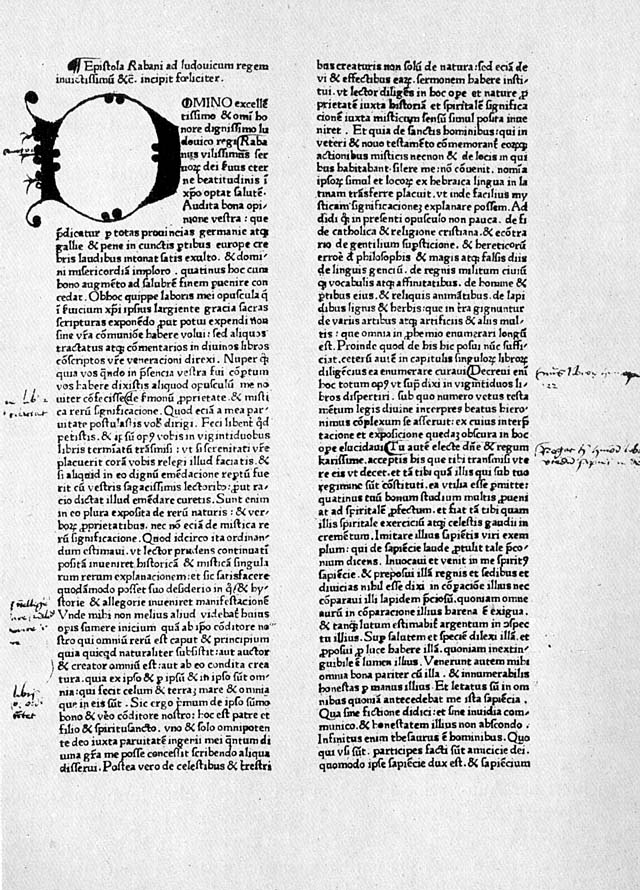
Page from Rabanus' De rerum naturis

Rabanus was born to noble parents in Mainz. The date of his birth remains uncertain, but in 801 he was ordained a deacon at the Benedictine Abbey of Fulda in Hesse, where he was schooled and become a monk. At the insistence of Ratgar, his abbot, he went together with Haimo (later of Halberstadt) to complete his studies at Tours. There he studied under Alcuin, who in recognition of his diligence and purity gave him the surname of Maurus, after the favourite disciple of Benedict, Saint Maurus.

Returning to Fulda, in 803 he was entrusted with the principal charge of the abbey school, which under his direction became one of the most preeminent centers of scholarship and book production in Europe, and sent forth pupils like Walafrid Strabo, Servatus Lupus of Ferrières, and Otfrid of Weissenburg. It was probably at this time when he compiled his excerpt from the grammar of Priscian, a popular textbook during the Middle Ages. According to Alban Butler's Lives of the Saints, Rabanus ate no meat and drank no wine.

In 814 Rabanus was ordained a priest. Shortly afterwards, apparently on account of a disagreement with Abbot Ratgar, he withdrew for a time from Fulda. This banishment was long thought to have occasioned a pilgrimage to Palestine, based on an allusion in his commentary on Joshua. However, the passage in question is taken from Origen's Homily xiv In Librum Jesu Nave. Hence, it was Origen, not Rabanus, who visited Palestine. Rabanus returned to Fulda in 817 on the election of the new abbot Eigil, and at Eigil's death in 822, Rabanus himself became abbot. He handled this position efficiently and successfully, but in 842 he resigned so as to have greater leisure for study and prayer, retiring to the neighbouring monastery of St Petersberg.

In 847 Rabanus was constrained to return to public life when he was elected to succeed Otgar as Archbishop of Mainz. He died at Winkel on the Rhine in 856.

== Hymns ==
Rabanus composed a number of hymns, the most famous of which is the Veni Creator Spiritus. This is a hymn to the Holy Spirit often sung at Pentecost, ordinations and the papal conclave. It is known in English through many translations, including Come, Holy Ghost, our souls inspire; Come, Holy Ghost, Creator blest; and Creator Spirit, by whose aid. Veni Creator Spiritus was used by Gustav Mahler as the first chorale of his eighth symphony.

Another of Rabanus' hymns, Christ, the fair glory of the holy angels (Christe, sanctorum decus Angelorum), sung for the commemoration of Saint Michael and All Angels, and to include the archangels Gabriel and Raphael, is found in English translation in The Hymnal 1982 (of the Episcopal Church), and was harmonized by Ralph Vaughan Williams.

== Works ==
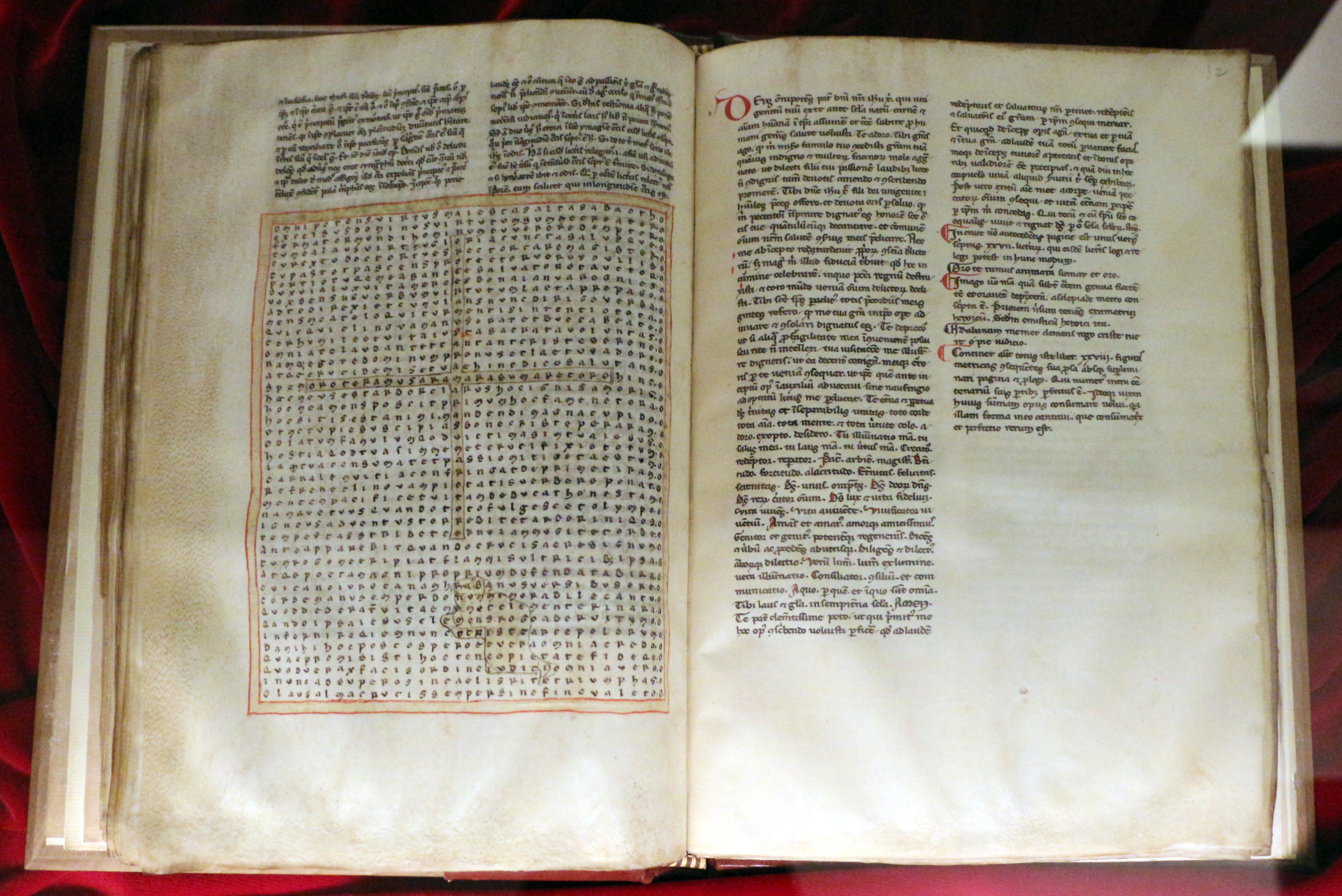
In Honorem Sanctae Crucis, 13th century, Biblioteca Medicea Laurenziana, Florence

Rabanus' works, many of which as of 1911 remained unpublished, comprise commentaries on scripture (Genesis to Judges, Ruth, Kings, Chronicles, Judith, Esther, Canticles, Proverbs, Wisdom, Sirach, Jeremiah, Lamentations, Ezekiel, Maccabees, Matthew, the Epistles of St Paul, including Hebrews); and various treatises on doctrinal and practical subjects, including more than one series of homilies. In De institutione clericorum he brought into prominence the views of Augustine and Gregory the Great as to the training required for a right discharge of the clerical function. One of his most popular and enduring works is a collection of poems centered on the cross, called De laudibus sanctae crucis or In honorem sanctae crucis, a set of highly sophisticated poems that present the cross (and, in the last poem, Rabanus himself kneeling before it) in word and image, even in numbers.

Among the others may be mentioned the De universo libri xxii., sive etymologiarum opus, a kind of dictionary or encyclopedia, heavily dependent upon Isidore of Seville's Etymologies, designed as a help towards the typological, historical and mystical interpretation of Scripture, the De sacris ordinibus, the De disciplina ecclesiastica and the Martyrologium. All of them are characterized by erudition (he knew even some Greek and Hebrew). He also wrote the De procinctu romanae miliciae, an annotated abridgement of the De re militari by Vegetius, to improve Frankish warfare.

In the annals of German philology a special interest attaches to the Glossaria Latino-Theodisca. A commentary, Super Porphyrium, printed by Cousin in 1836 among the Ouvrages inédits d'Abélard, and assigned both by that editor and by Haurau to Hrabantis Maurus, is now generally believed to be the work of a disciple.

In 2006 Germany marked the 1150th anniversary of his death, especially in Mainz and in Fulda. Highlights of the celebrations included the display of Codex Vaticanus Reginensis latinus 124, an extremely rare loan by the Vatican to Mainz of a spectacular manuscript containing De laudibus sanctae crucis. The anniversary also saw the publication of no fewer than three book-length studies of Maurus and his work.

=== Marcomannic runes ===
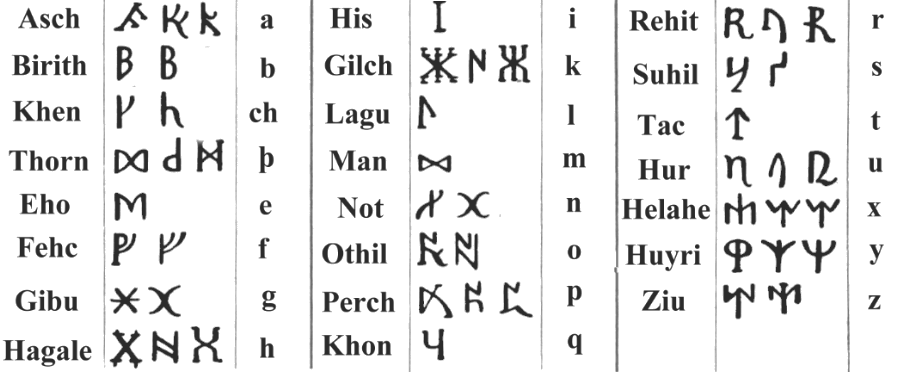
Marcomannic runes

A runic alphabet recorded in a treatise called De Inventione Litterarum has been ascribed to Rabanus. It consisted of a mixture of Elder Futhark with Anglo-Saxon runes and is preserved in 8th and 9th-century manuscripts mainly from the southern part of the Carolingian Empire (Alemannia, Bavaria). The manuscript text attributes the runes to the Marcomanni, quos nos Nordmannos vocamus (and hence traditionally, the alphabet is called "Marcomannic runes") but it has no connection with the Marcomanni, and rather is an attempt of Carolingian scholars to represent all letters of the Latin alphabet with runic equivalents.

Wilhelm Grimm discussed these runes in 1821.

== Bibliography ==
The first nominally complete edition of the works of Hrabanus Maurus was by Georges Colvener (Cologne, 6 vols. fol., 1627). The Opera omnia form vols. cvii–cxii of Migne's Patrologiae cursus completus (1852). The De universo is the subject of Compendium der Naturwissenschaften an der Schule zu Fulda im IX. Jahrhundert (Berlin, 1880).

Recent critical editions and translations are available of some of his works:

- De sermonum proprietate sive Opus de universo, ed. and tr. by Priscilla Throop, Hrabanus Maurus: De Universo: the peculiar properties of words and their mystical significance, 2 vols. Charlotte, VT: MedievalMS, 2009.
- Expositio in Matthaeum, edited by B. Löfstedt, 2 vols. Corpus Christianorum, continuatio medievalis 174-174A. Turnhout: Brepols, 2000.
- In honorem sanctae crucis, edited by M. Perrin, 2 vols. Corpus Christianorum, continuatio medievalis 100-100A. Turnhout: Brepols, 1997.
- De magicis artibus, partial English translation in European Magic and Witchcraft: a reader, tr. Martha Rampton, 2018, pp. 143-145
- Martyrologium. Liber de computo, edited by J. McCulloh and W. Stevens, Corpus Christianorum, continuatio mediaevalis 44. Turnhout: Brepols, 1997.
- Hrabanus Maurus: De institutione clericorum; Studien und Edition, Freiburger Beitraege zur mittelalterlichen Geschichte 7. Frankfurt am Main: 1996. An edition (with German translation?) of the De Institutione Clericorum is listed as "in preparation" by Brepols. An English translation by Owen M. Phelan, On the Formation of Clergy, was published by Catholic University of America Press as part of their The Fathers of the Church: Mediaeval Continuations series, 2023.

German publications on the occasion of the 1150th anniversary of his death:

- Hans-Jürgen Kotzur, ed., Rabanus Maurus: Auf den Spuren eines karolingischen Gelehrten. Mainz: Philipp von Zabern, 2006. ISBN 3-8053-3613-6. 120 pages, 85 illustrations, including Maurus's cross poems and their transcriptions and partial translations.
- Stephanie Haarländer, Rabanus Maurus zum Kennenlernen: Ein Lesebuch mit einer Einführung in sein Leben und Werk. Publikationen Bistum Mainz. Darmstadt: Wissenschaftliche Buchgeselschaft, 2006. ISBN 978-3-934450-24-0. 184 pages, many illustrations. Collection of texts by Maurus translated into German, with extensive introduction to Maurus's life and work.
- Franz J. Felten, ed., Hrabanus Maurus: Gelehrter, Abt von Fulda und Erzbischof von Mainz. Mainz: Publikationen Bistum Mainz, 2006. ISBN 978-3-934450-26-4. 196 pages, 4 illustrations. Collection of historical essays.

See also:

- Raymund Kottje, Verzeichnis der Handschriften mit den Werken des Hrabanus Maurus [Index of Manuscripts with the Works of Hrabanus Maurus]. Hannover: Hahnsche Buchhandlung, 2012. ISBN 978-3-7752-1134-5.
- William Schipper, "'Unpublished' Commentaries by Hrabanus Maurus," The Journal of Medieval Latin 27 (2017), pp. 223-301.

== Sources ==
- Herbermann, Charles, ed. (1913). "Blessed Maurus Magnentius Rabanus" . Catholic Encyclopedia. New York: Robert Appleton Company.
- Migne, Jacques Paul (orig. 1852), Opera Omnia. Patrologia Latina with analytical indexes.

Preceded by Odgar	Archbishop of Mainz; 848–856	Succeeded by Charles
