= Hitto of Freising =

Bishop of Freising from 811 to 835

- Bishop of Freising
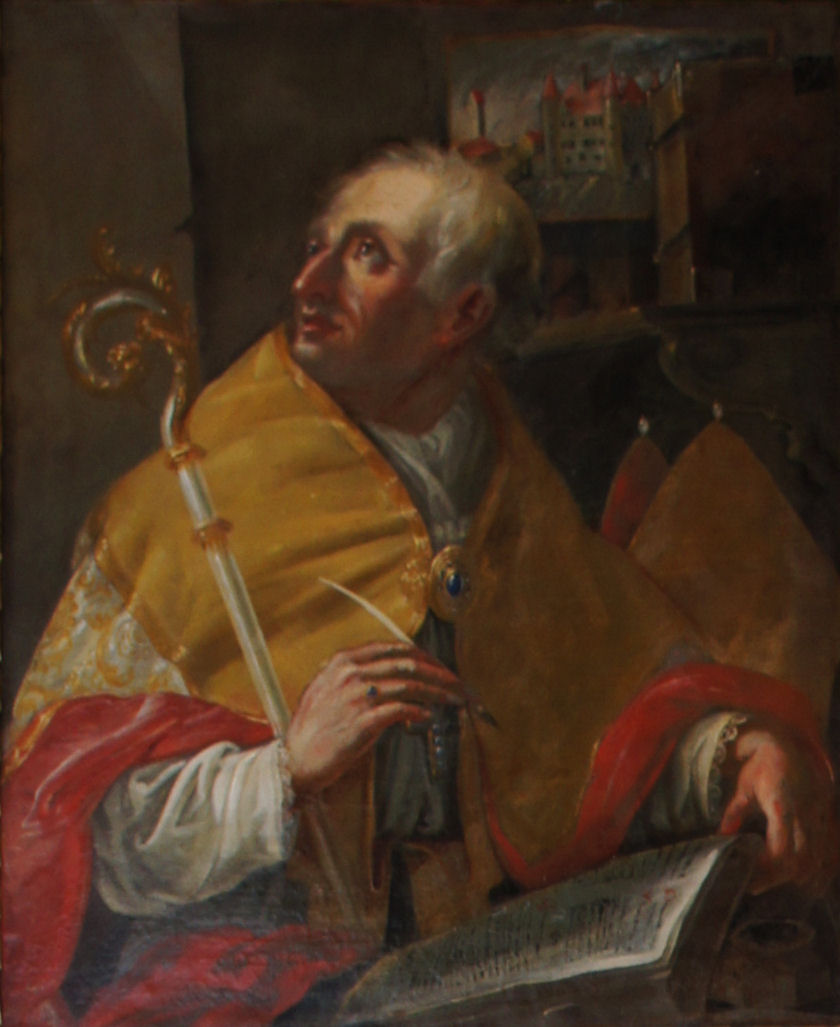
- Bishop Hitto of Freising
- Diocese: Freising
- In office: 811 – 835
- Predecessor: Atto of Friesing
- Successor: Erchanbert of Friesing

Personal details
- Died: 835 Freising
- Buried: Crypt in Freising Cathedral
- Denomination: Roman Catholic

Hitto of Freising (died 835) was the sixth Bishop of Freising in the Duchy of Bavaria. He held the office from December 811 to 835.

He was descended from the Huosi family, part of the Bavarian upper aristocracy (Hochadel). In 794, the cleric became the deacon of Freising Cathedral and was frequently named as a witness in the Freising documents. He is first recorded as Bishop of Freising in 811, his predecessor, Atto, however, had died over a year earlier.

During his time in office, the monk and notary, Kozroh (or Cozroh), compiled the first Freising Book of Traditions (Freisinger Traditionsbuch). The work consists of three parts; the first was a cartulary of legal documents during the time of previous bishops (730-811); the second was a cartulary of legal conveyances and litigations under Hitto (811-835); the third part was a record of the transactions under Hitto's successor, Erchanbert, up to the year 848.

Under Hitto, the Freising scriptorium reached a special high point; for example, about 40 codices were written. In addition, over 300 documents from Hitto's time in office have survived.

Hitto worked to establish episcopal supremacy over the many, hitherto aristocratic, independent monasteries within the diocese (such as Schliersee Abbey in 817, Schäftlarn Abbey in 821 or 828, and Innichen Abbey in 822). He was also the founder of Weihenstephan Abbey around 830. Hitto also attempted to introduce the Rule of St. Benedict, but faced resistance from other clergy. While compiling the cartularies, Cozroh drew attention to Hitto's passion in reforming sacred studies and liturgy.

According to an old tradition, during his pilgrimage to Rome in 834 Hitto was given the relics of Saint Justin by Pope Gregory IV and brought them to Freising.

Hitto was buried in the cathedral crypt at Freising and his sarcophagus is preserved. His nephew Erchanbert became his successor.

== Bibliography ==
- Theodor Bitterauf, Die Tradition des Hochstifts Freising, I, 1905, pp. 300–367.
- Gertrud Diepolder, Freisinger Traditionen und Memorialeinträge im Salzburger Liber Vitae und im Reichenauer Verbrüderungsbuch, Auswertung der Parallelüberlieferung aus der Zeit der Bischöfe Hitto und Erchanbert von Freising, ZBLG, 58 (1995), pp. 147–190

Catholic Church titles
Preceded by Atto of freising	Bishop of Friesing; 811 – 835	Succeeded by Erchanbert of Friesing
