= De rerum naturis =

Early encyclopedia by Rabanus Maurus

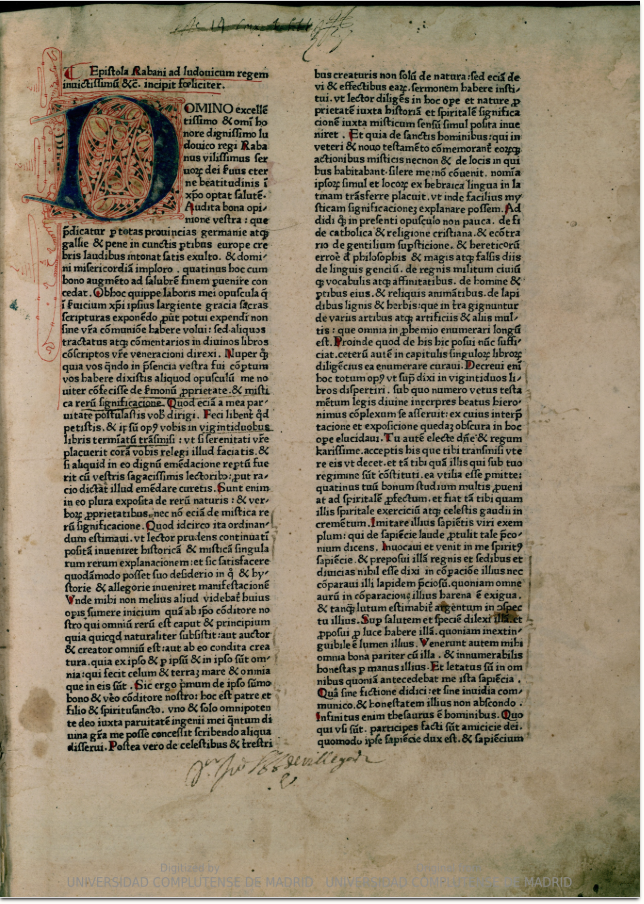
First printed edition of Hrabanus Maurus's encyclopedia, from the Universidad Computense, Madrid, downloaded through HathiTrust

De rerum naturis (“On the Nature of Things”), also known as De universo (“On the Universe”) and De sermonum proprietate, sive Opus de universo, is an encyclopaedia in 22 books, written in Latin in 842–847. It is one of the best-known works by Rabanus Maurus, a Frankish Benedictine monk and very prominent writer of the Carolingian age.

The work is fundamentally pedagogical, designed to aid its readers in the historical and mystical interpretation of religious scripture. It compiles knowledge of the 9th century, including a wide variety of topics varying from God to topographical features of the Earth.

== Background ==
Rabanus was evicted from the Fulda abbacy in 842, and amid fratricidal tensions found refuge in the monastery of Petersburg, before his appointment as archbishop at Mainz. He wrote to Haymo of Halberstadt that he intended to write "a small work, in which you would find written not only the natures of things and the properties of words, but also the mystical signification of those same things, so that you might find set out in continuous order the historical and mystical exposition of each thing". As Hans Hummer summarises, “De rerum naturis expressed with summative clarity the world as the most erudite of Carolingian clerics wished to see it in the aftermath of the civil tumults of the 830s and early 840s: a divinely ordained cosmos in which creation and history in their particulars were signs of what was truly real: the transcendent, celestial Order, and the corruption of that Order within creation by sin and the Devil.”

== Overview and contents ==
The encyclopaedia is based on the Etymologies by Isidore of Seville (c.625), written over two centuries earlier. It began as a major reworking of this text, and was dedicated to Louis the German, the king of East Francia, who was responsible for Rabanus’ deposition, as described in letters from Rabanus to Louis the German himself.

The Etymologies contained 20 books whose first five covered liberal arts, medicine, and law, before moving onto sacred matters and God at book 7. However, Rabanus chose to divide the contents of the encyclopaedia into 22 books to reflect the 22 books in Jerome’s translation of the “Old Testament of Divine Law”. The encyclopaedia can thus be said to have two sections: books 1–11 are concerned with theological matters, and books 12–22 focus on more secular matters.

Rather than starting with secular, educational topics, as Isidore did, Rabanus started his encyclopaedia immediately with Christian subjects: God, the Holy Trinity and heavenly beings. Isidore's first two chapters on trivium (part of the Liberal Arts) are completely left out, in order to express that all knowledge and meaning was derived from divine revelation. To reflect the order of the Christian universe, Rabanus then ‘descends’ through the celestial spheres to the Earth, putting subjects in accordance with the sequence of salvific history (i.e. starting with the Old Testament then moving on to the New Testament). Then there are chapters on the Church, the gathering of Scriptures and the crux of divine creation: conscious beings. Books 6 and 7 describe humans, their relationships and herding animals. Book 8 describes wild animals. Books 9–14 follow the order of creation in Genesis: celestial matter, the heavens, time, water, and lastly the Earth and its topographical features. These latter two books comprise part of what can be understood as the second and more secular section of the encyclopaedia. The last nine books cover various topics, including a book on paganism which had once been part of Isidore's book on the Church, but was now separated. Plants and herbs, rocks and minerals, birds, animals and fish, and the elements are all touched upon, as well as geography, astronomy, metallurgy, music and the arts. The structure of the encyclopaedia reflects overall that for Rabanus, knowledge of the universe could not be separated from God as its source and in turn from knowing God. The division of sacred and secular between the first and second halves of the text, as seen in the earliest manuscript copies, was an innovative encyclopaedic structure and technique.

== Manuscripts and printed editions ==
The text's enduring popularity is evidenced in the numerous surviving copies, fragments, adaptations, and extracts. Additionally, the existence of multiple heavily annotated manuscripts of the encyclopaedia indicates that Rabanus’ text was not only copied but was also studied, acting as a sort of textbook for its readers. There are 35 existing manuscript copies of De rerum naturis, in addition to multiple fragments: three fragmentary copies exist, preserved in Orléans, Stuttgart, and Troye. Other manuscript editions include:

- St John's College MS 5
- Vatican City Biblioteca Apostolica Vaticana, MS Vat. lat. 1850
- Codex Casinensis 132: from the Biblioteca del Monumento nazionale di Montecassino. Written in Beneventan script. This is the oldest illustrated version of the work extant, produced during the 11th century at Montecassino for Abbot Theobald.
- Mainz, Martinus-Bibliothek, Fragm. D/378: a bifolium discovered in 2010 which contains part of Books 21 and 22 of the De rerum naturis.

There are eight illustrated copies: five complete and three fragmentary. These should not be viewed as an accurate portrayal of the state of the text at its inception. The earliest of the illustrated manuscripts, Montecassino, Biblioteca dell’Abbazia, MS 132 EE, was copied in 1023 and thus does not reflect the state of the text during Hrabanus’ lifetime. Its 22 books have more than 300 figurative illustrations and miniatures.

The earliest printed edition (edito princeps) of De rerum naturis was edited and printed by Adolf Rusch (the so-called "R-Printer"), one of the most important printers of the early period in Strasbourg. It was originally thought that the book was printed before 1467, based on an inscription in the BnF copy at Paris. However, that date is now regarded as incorrect, possibly due to a transposition of the final two digits (intended to read ‘1476’). The next earliest date associated with the book is from a purchase inscription in the copy held at the Wellcome Institute, London, dated 1474. This aligns with other more firm dates associated with the R-Press. This edition is also believed to be the first use of Roman type printed in Germany. This version of the text is also historically significant as the first known printed text on medicine, a subject to which Book 5, chapter 18 is dedicated. The British Library website lists 89 institutions holding this version of the text.

George Colvener reprinted the Ruysch edition of the text (Note: Available here at Wikisource.) in his collected edition of Rabanus's works in 1627 at Cologne, and it was printed again by Jacques-Paul Migne in the series Patrologia Latina in 1851 (vol. 111, cols. 1–680). The Migne edition is considered unreliable.

The occasion of the 1150th anniversary of Rabanus’ death has seen a more recent revival of interest in Rabanus, renewing the appetite for critical editions and translations of his works.
