= Hebertshausen =

- Municipality
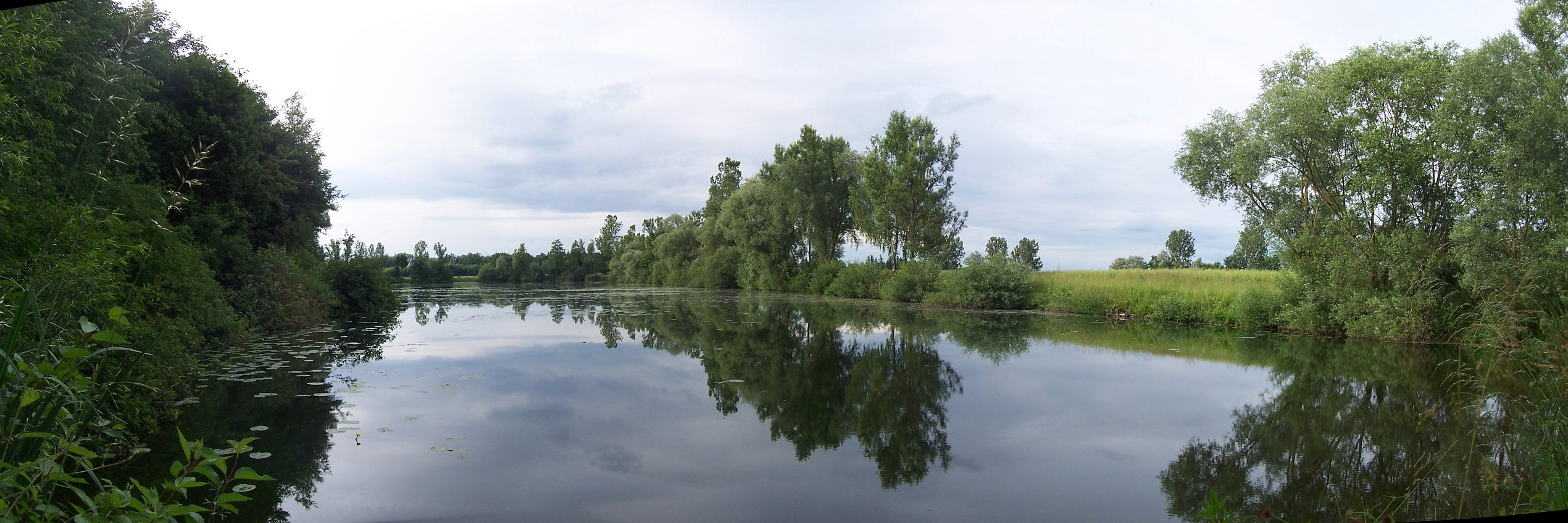
- Lake near Hackermoos

- Coat of arms

- Location of Hebertshausen within Dachau district
- Interactive map of Hebertshausen
- Location within Germany Location within Bavaria
- Coordinates: 48°17′27″N 11°28′09″E
- Country: Germany
- State: Bavaria
- Admin. region: Oberbayern
- District: Dachau
- Subdivisions: 15 Ortsteile

Government
  - Mayor (2020–26): Richard Reischl (CSU)

Area
  - Total: 29.60 km^{2} (11.43 sq mi)
- Elevation: 489 m (1,604 ft)

Population (2025-12-31)
  - Total: 5,781
  - Density: 195.3/km^{2} (505.8/sq mi)
- Time zone: UTC+01:00 (CET)
  - Summer (DST): UTC+02:00 (CEST)
- Postal codes: 85241
- Dialling codes: 08131
- Vehicle registration: DAH
- Website: www.hebertshausen.de

Hebertshausen is a municipality in the district of Dachau in Bavaria in Germany.

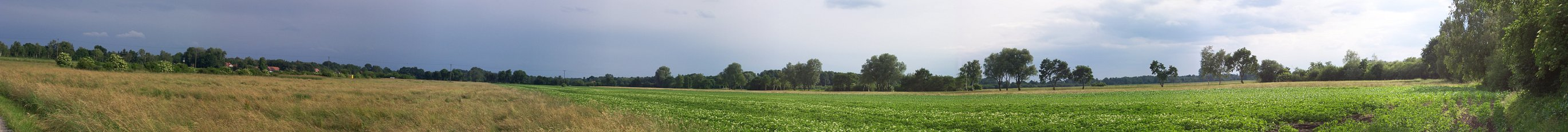
