= Freising Cathedral =

- Saint Mary and Saint Corbinian Co-Cathedral
- Dom St. Maria und St. Korbinian
- Mariendom
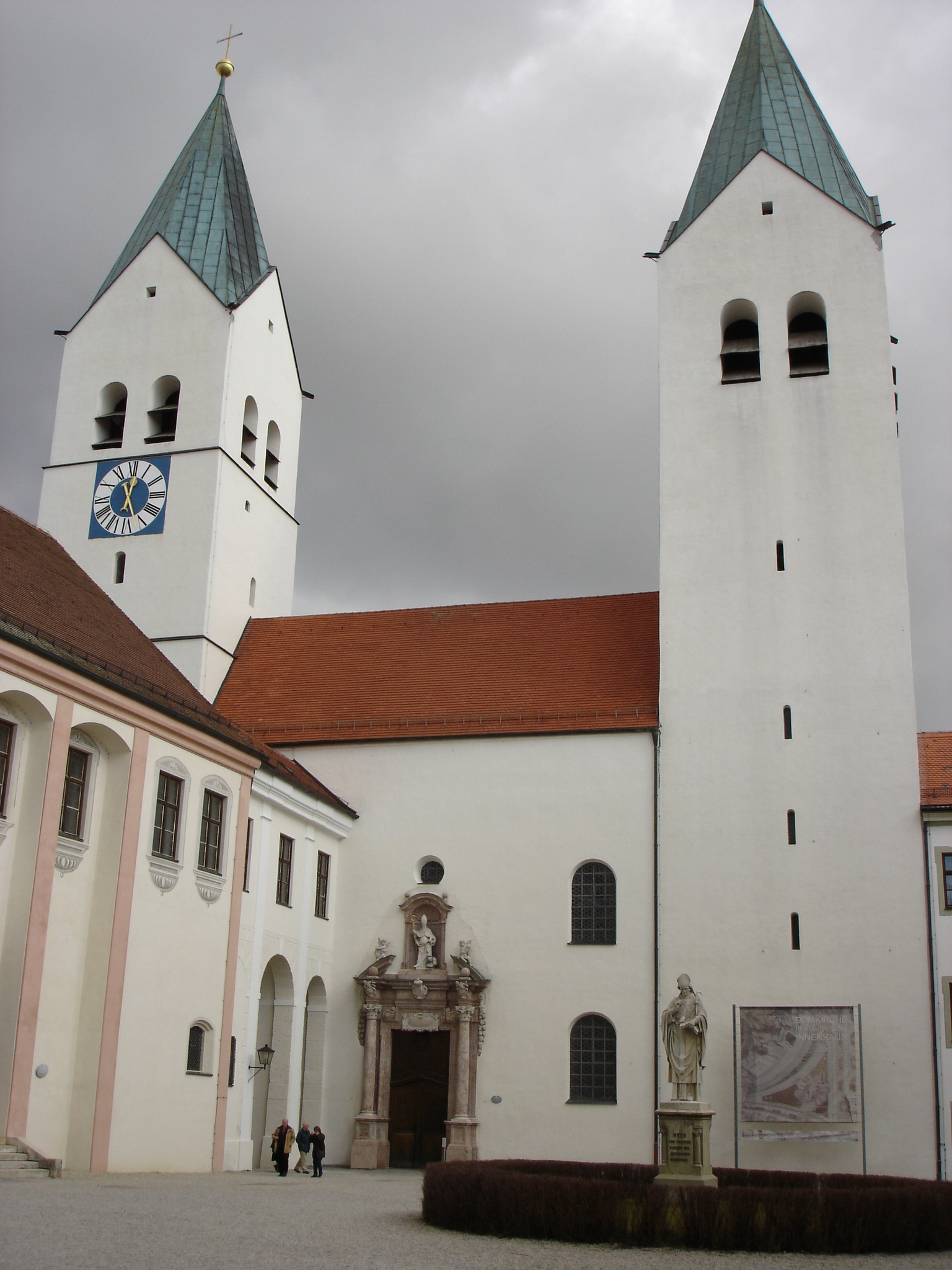
- Freising Cathedral
- 48°23′56″N 11°44′47″E
- Location: Freising
- Country: Germany
- Denomination: Roman Catholic
- Website: Website

History
- Status: Active
- Founded: 1159
- Consecrated: 1205

Architecture
- Functional status: Co-Cathedral
- Architectural type: Basilica
- Style: Romanesque, Baroque and Gothic

Administration
- Archdiocese: Archdiocese of Munich and Freising

Clergy
- Archbishop: Reinhard Marx

Freising Cathedral, also called Saint Mary and Corbinian Cathedral (German: Mariendom), is a Romanesque basilica in Freising, Bavaria. It is the co-cathedral of the Catholic Archdiocese of Munich and Freising. Freising Cathedral is also known for being the place where Pope Benedict XVI was ordained a priest.

== History ==
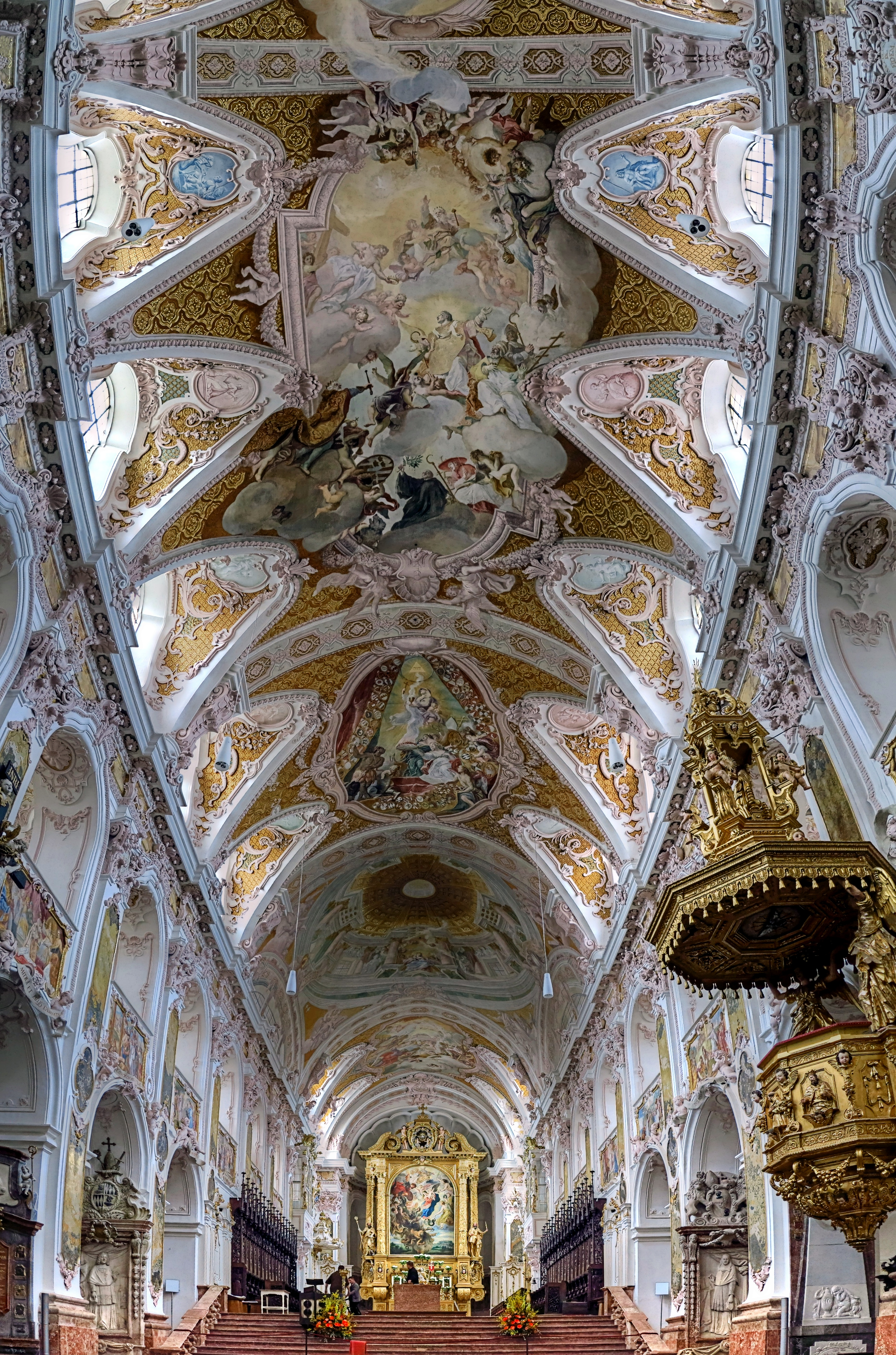
View of the rococo interior with the high altar in the background

An early church was present on the site by AD 715, consecrated as episcopal church by Boniface in 739. A triple nave was constructed in 860 and rebuilt after a fire in 903. The church was completely destroyed by fire on Palm Sunday, 5 April 1159. Construction of the current romanesque building started in 1159 and completed in 1205. The romanesque wooden ceiling was replaced by a gothic vault in 1481–3.

The tomb of St. Corbinian, the patron saint of the bishopric, is located in the four-nave crypt of the cathedral. In the centre of this crypt one of the most distinguished sculptures in Europe is located: the Bestiensäule ("pillar of beasts"), carved in the high Middle Ages.

Substantial reconstruction was undertaken during the Baroque period, beginning in 1619. A complete renovation begun in 1621, and its nearly completed high altar was consecrated on 1 January 1624. In 1623, Prince-Bishop Veit Adam von Gepeckh of Freising commissioned Hans Rottenhammer (1564-1625) to paint a vast altarpiece. Rottenhammer was near the end of his career (and life) and possibly an alcoholic, and his work was delayed. The commission was transferred to Rubens at an unknown time. Rubens completed the painting of the Woman of the Apocalypse, a subject that had been very popular in German iconography since the 15th century. The bishop had commissioned a subject "applicable to all feast days of the Blessed Virgin" (so sich auf alle unser Lieben Frauen Fest applizieren liesse), which made the Madonna of the Revelation, associated in Counter-Reformation iconography with both the Assumption of the Virgin and the Immaculate Conception, an apt choice. The finished painting is first mentioned in 1632, when it was evacuated from the advancing Swedish troops. It is now kept in the Alte Pinakothek, Munich.

Another renovation was undertaken in 1724, in view of the church's thousand-year anniversary. The rococo decoration of the interior created is a work of Cosmas Damian Asam and Egid Quirin Asam. In the 1920s, some of the frescoes were painted over and severely damaged. These were restored in 2006.

== Bibliography ==
- Mark Bankus: Der Freisinger Domberg und sein Umland. Untersuchungen zur prähistorischen Besiedlung. Leidorf, Rahden 2004, ISBN 3-89646-891-X.
- Hermann-Joseph Busley: Die Geschichte des Freisinger Domkapitels von den Anfängen bis zur Wende des 14./15. Jahrhunderts. Dissertation, Universität München 1956.
