= Otgar of Mainz =

Archbishop of Mainz

Odgar
- Archbishop of Mainz
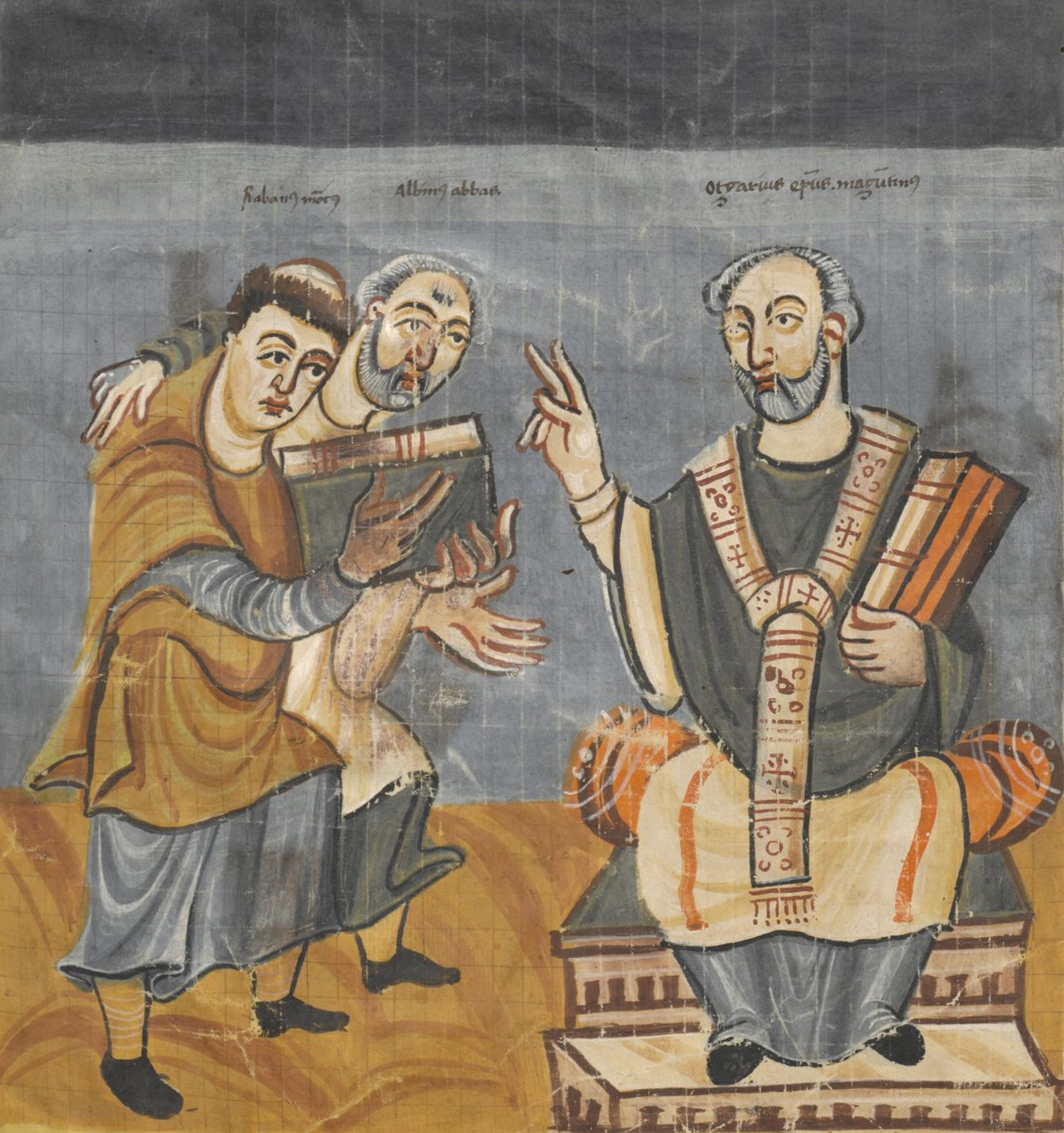
- Rabanus Maurus (left), supported by Alcuin (middle) presents his work to Archbishop Otgar of Mainz (right)
- Church: Catholic Church
- Diocese: Electorate of Mainz
- In office: 826–847
- Successor: Rabanus Maurus

Personal details
- Died: 21 April 847

Otgar (died 21 April 847), also spelled Odgar, Otker or Otger, Latin Otgarius, was the archbishop of Mainz from 826 until his death.

== Life ==
In 834, Archbishop Otgar made a pilgrimage to the Seven Pilgrim Churches of Rome. Upon his return he brought some of the relics of Justinus and built Saint Justin's Church in Höchst to house them.

In 838, Bishop Otgar translated the relics of Saint Aurelius of Riditio from the chapel of Saint Nazarius at Hirsau to the Church of St. Aurelius at Hirsau Abbey and formally consecrated the abbey church.

During the years 838–839, Otgar supported Louis the Pious against his son Louis the German who was in rebellion and trying to get all of East Francia under his control. He remained strongly opposed to the younger Louis even after the elder's death in 840. He supported Lothair I in the civil war that lasted until 843. In 842, he even tried to prevent Louis the German from meeting Charles the Bald and allying with him against Lothair. When Otgar finally died, Louis's hold on East Francia strengthened under his successor, Rabanus Maurus.

== Sources ==
- Annales Fuldenses (Manchester Medieval series, Ninth-Century Histories, Volume II.) Reuter, Timothy (trans.) Manchester: Manchester University Press, 1992.

Preceded by Haistulph	Archbishop of Mainz; 826–847	Succeeded by Rabanus Maurus
