= 11th century in architecture =

== Buildings and structures ==
=== Buildings ===
- 1001
  - The Cathedral of Ani is built in Armenia.
  - St. Michael's Church, Hildesheim begun.
- 1002 – Brihadishwara Temple of Thanjavur, India (Chola Empire) begun.
- 1008 – Rebuilt Torcello Cathedral in the Veneto consecrated.
- 1009 – Saint-Martin-du-Canigou in Catalonia consecrated.
- By c. 1010 – Church of the Saviour at Berestove built.
- 1011 – San Vittore alle Chiuse in Genga, Papal States built.
- c. 1012 – Katholikon of Hosios Loukas built in Byzantine Greece.
- 1013
  - Al-Hakim Mosque in Cairo, Fatimid Empire built (begun in 990).
  - San Miniato al Monte begun in Florence, Italy (work went on until the 13th century).
- 1016 – San Michele in Borgo in Pisa, Tuscany built.
- c. 1017 – Hōjōji (法成寺) built in Heian-kyō, Japan.
- 1021 – Church of the Quedlinburg Abbey, Holy Roman Empire built (begun c. 997).
- 1022 – Monastery of Sant Pere de Rodes, Catalonia consecrated.
- c. 1023 – Romanesque church at Mont-Saint-Michel founded.
- c. 1025 – City of Gangaikonda Cholapuram founded as a capital of the Chola Empire.
- 1026 – Pomposa Abbey near Ferrara, Italy, completed (except the campanile finished in 1063).
- 1029 – Construction of Sant Vicenç de Cardonia, Catalonia begun.
- 1030 – Speyer Cathedral, Germany, initiated by Emperor Konrad II.
- 1032 – Santa Maria de Ripoll, Catalonia is consecrated.
- 1033 – St. Michael's Church, Hildesheim, Holy Roman Empire, completed and consecrated.
- 1036 – Al-Aqsa Mosque in Jerusalem restored and renovated by the Fatimid caliph after an earthquake in 1033.
- 1037
  - Chartres Cathedral in France consecrated for the fifth time (subsequently rebuilt).
  - St Sophia Cathedral in Kyiv founded.
- 1040
  - Sant Vicenç de Cardona, Catalonia is completed.
  - Construction of Notre-Dame-de-Jumièges in Normandy begins.
  - Construction of the third Würzburg Cathedral in the Holy Roman Empire begins.
- 1045 – Lingxiao Pagoda (凌霄塔) in Zhengding, China is completed.
- 1047 – Reconstruction of St Mark's Basilica in Venice begins.
- 1049
  - Saint Rémi of Reims Basilica in France is consecrated
  - Iron Pagoda (鐵塔) of Bianjing, China is completed.
  - Abbey Church of Ottmarsheim, Alsace is consecrated.
- c. 1050
  - West Mebon built in Angkor.
  - Rajarani Temple built in Bhubaneswar, Odisha.
  - Construction of Église Notre-Dame de l'Assomption, Rouffach, begins.
- 1050
  - Abbaye Notre-Dame de Bernay in Normandy completed.
  - Construction of Basilica of Sant'Abbondio in Como, Lombardy begins.
- 1053
  - Varadharaja Perumal Temple of Kanchipuram in India (Chola Empire) built.
  - Phoenix Hall of the Byōdō-in in Heian-kyō, Japan built.
- 1055 – Liaodi Pagoda (料敵塔), Hebei, China is completed
- 1056 – Sakyamuni Pagoda of Fogong Temple (佛宫寺释迦塔), Shanxi, China is completed
- 1057
  - Church of Monastery of San Salvador of Leyre, Navarra consecrated.
  - Near Caves (Pechersk Lavra) founded.
- 1059 – Abbaye aux Dames, Caen founded.
- c. 1060
  - Construction of the Baphuon in Yasodharapura, Khmer Empire.
  - Lawkananda Pagoda built in Bagan, Pagan Kingdom.
- 1061 – Speyer Cathedral, Germany, completed.
- 1062 – Construction of Abbaye aux Dames, Caen, Normandy begun.
- 1063
  - Rebuilding of Doge's Palace, Venice begun.
  - Basilica of San Isidoro, León, Spain, Spain consecrated.
- c. 1063 – Abbaye-aux-Hommes, Caen, Normandy founded.
- 1064
  - Abbey of Lessay, Normandy begun.
  - Duomo of Santa Maria Assunta in Pisa, Tuscany begun.
- 1065 – Sankt Maria im Kapitol, Cologne consecrated.
- 1067
  - Abbey of Jumièges, Normandy consecrated.
  - First of the Kharraqan towers built in Qazvin, Seljukid Iran.
  - Sankt Gereon, Cologne begun.
- 1068 – Warwick Castle established as a motte-and-bailey fortification by William I of England.
- 1070 – Nidaros Cathedral in Trondheim, Norway, begun.
- 1075 – Würzburg Cathedral reconstruction completed (begun in 1045).
- 1075 – Pilgrimage Church of St James, Santiago de Compostela begun.
- 1076 – Abbey of Gellone, Saint-Guilhem-le-Désert in the Languedoc completed.
- 1077
  - Abbaye-aux-Hommes, Caen, France consecrated.
  - Current Bayeux Cathedral, France consecrated.
- 1078 – White Tower (Tower of London) in England begun.
- c. 1078 – Duomo of Santa Maria Assunta in Pisa, Tuscany, completed.
- 1080 – Rebuilding of St. Sernin's Basilica, Toulouse begun.
- 1081
  - Current building of the Chora Church built in Constantinople (begun in 1077).
  - Old Mainz Cathedral destroyed by a fire, marking the beginning of the construction of the current building.
  - Aljafería Palace built in Zaragoza, Spain (begun in 1065).
- 1082 – Great Mosque of Tlemcen built in the Almoravid Empire.
- 1083 – Present Ely Cathedral in the east of England begun.
- 1086–87 – South dome of Jameh Mosque of Isfahan in Seljuq dynasty Persia, the world's largest dome at this time.
- By 1087 – Construction of the Church of Christ Pantepoptes in Constantinople begun.
- 1087
  - White Tower (Tower of London) (begun in 1078) probably largely completed.
  - San Nicola di Bari begun.
- 1088
  - Rebuilding of great church at Cluny Abbey in France ("Cluny III") begun.
  - Eynsford Castle built in England.
- 1089 – Romanesque stage of St Albans Cathedral in England completed.
- c. 1090 – Abbey Church of Saint-Savin-sur-Gartempe in Poitou completed (begun c. 1040).
- 1091
  - Cairo Fatimid city wall built (begun in 1087).
  - Ananda Temple built in Bagan, Pagan Kingdom capital.
- 1093
  - Second of the Kharraqan towers mausoleums built in Qazvin, Seljukid Iran.
  - Maria Laach Abbey in the Rhineland begun.
  - Durham Cathedral founded in the north of England.
- 1094
  - 40-foot-tall water-powered astronomical clocktower in Song dynasty's capital Bianjing designed by Su Song completed.
  - San Juan de la Peña Monastery in Aragon consecrated.
  - St Mark's Basilica in Venice consecrated.
- c. 1094 – Battle Abbey in England consecrated.
- 1095 – Sant'Abbondio, Como consecrated.
- 1096
  - St. Sernin's Basilica, Toulouse consecrated.
  - Norwich Cathedral begun in eastern England.
- 1097
  - Construction of the original stage of the Flower Pagoda in the Temple of the Six Banyan Trees in Guangzhou, Song dynasty.
  - Djamaa el Kebir mosque of Algiers built in Almoravid Algeria.
- 1098 – Trani Cathedral begun.
- 1099 – Modena Cathedral begun.
- By c. 1099 – Lingaraja Temple Bhubaneswar, Odisha, largely completed.
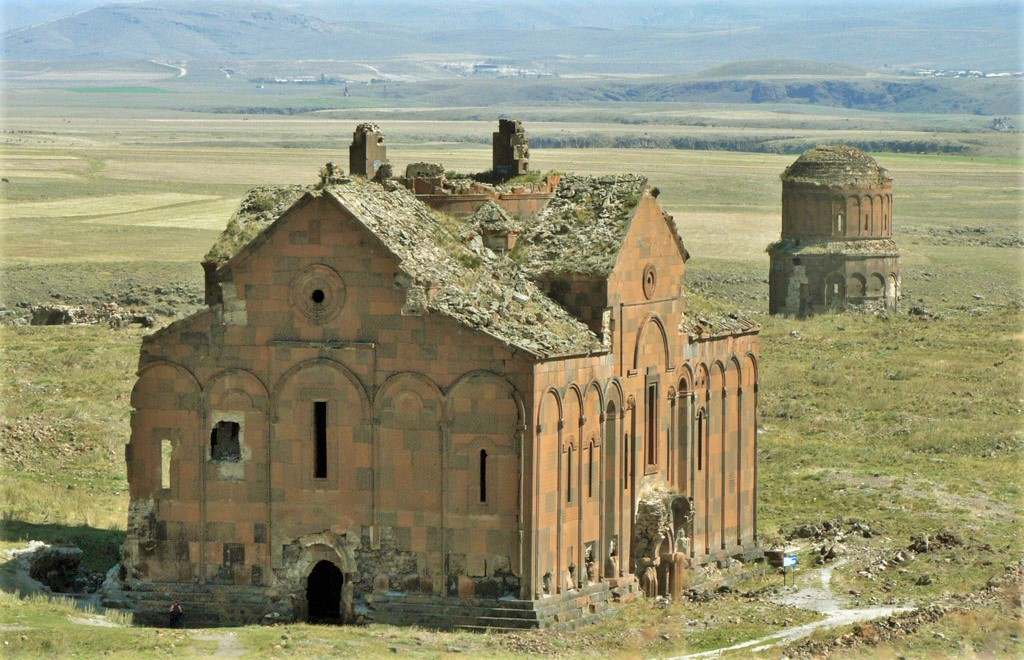
Cathedral of Ani (1001)

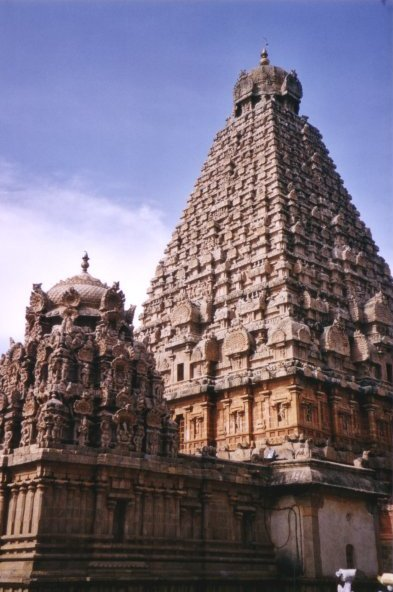
Brihadishwara Temple, Thanjavur (1002)

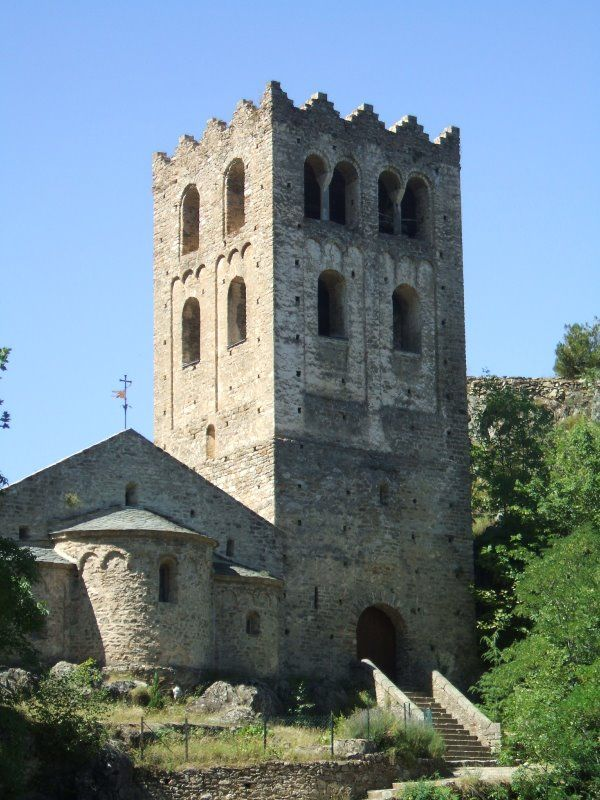
Saint-Martin-du-Canigou (1009)

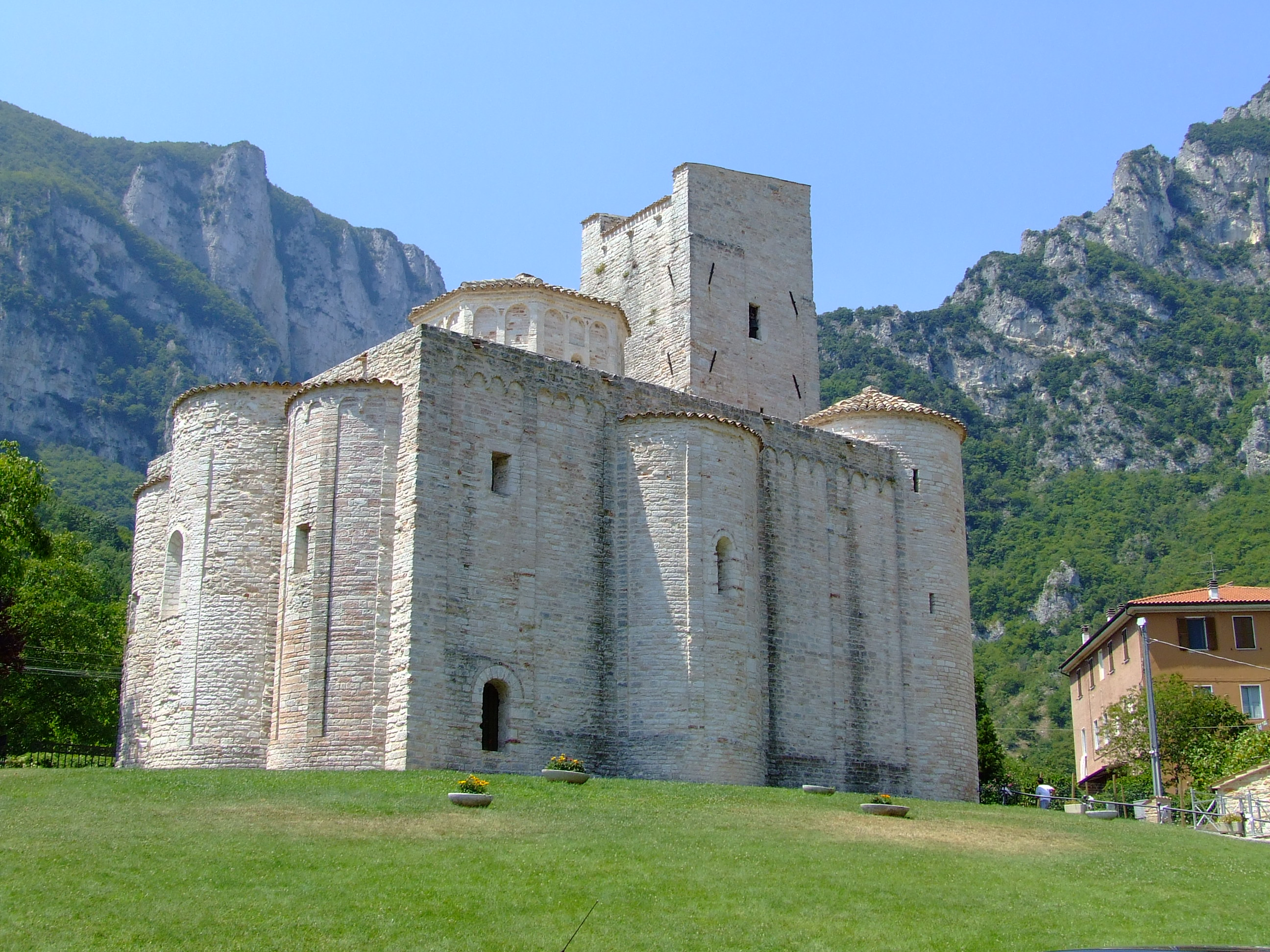
San Vittore alle Chiuse, Genga (1011)

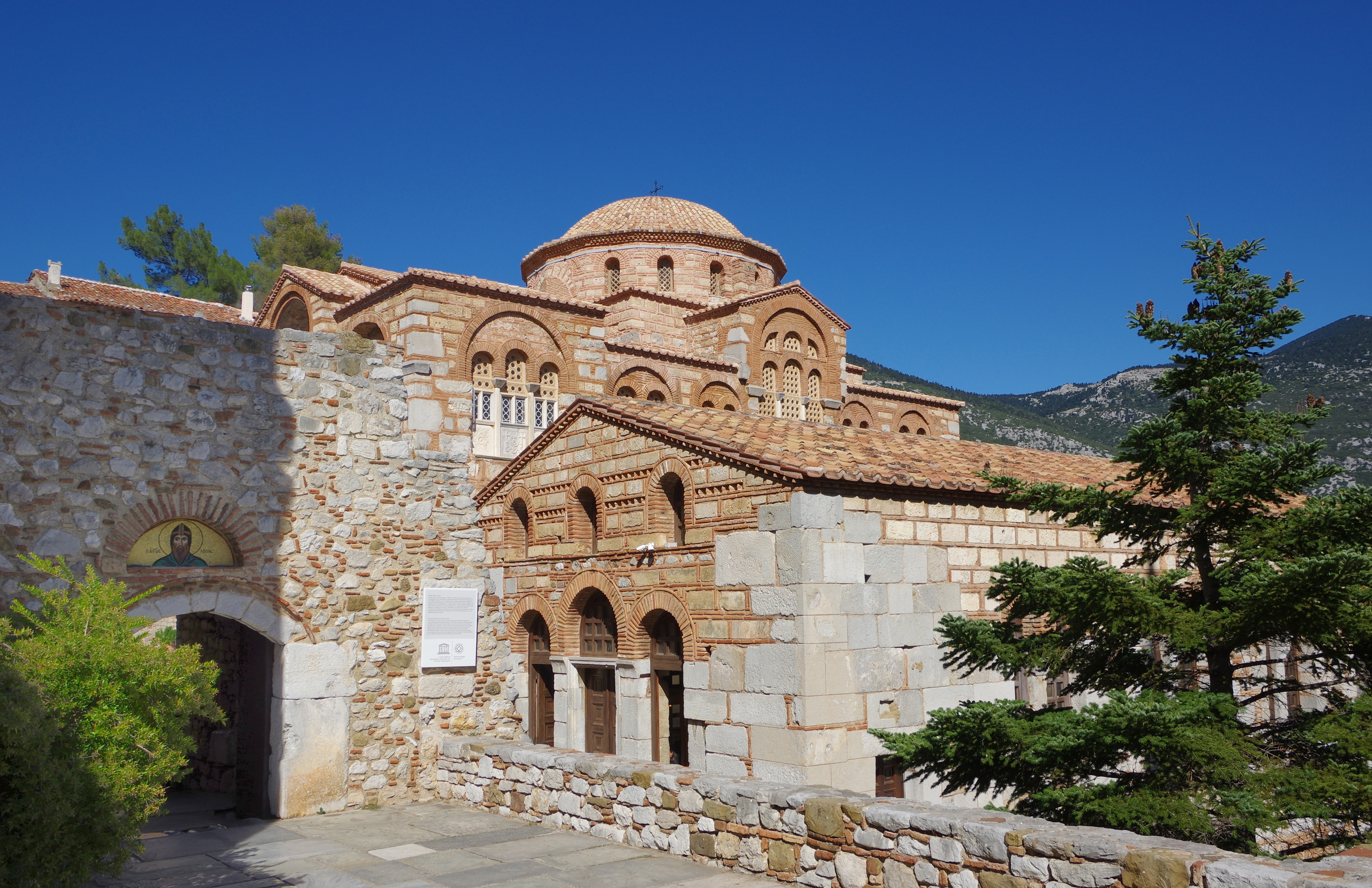
Katholikon, Hosios Loukas (1012)

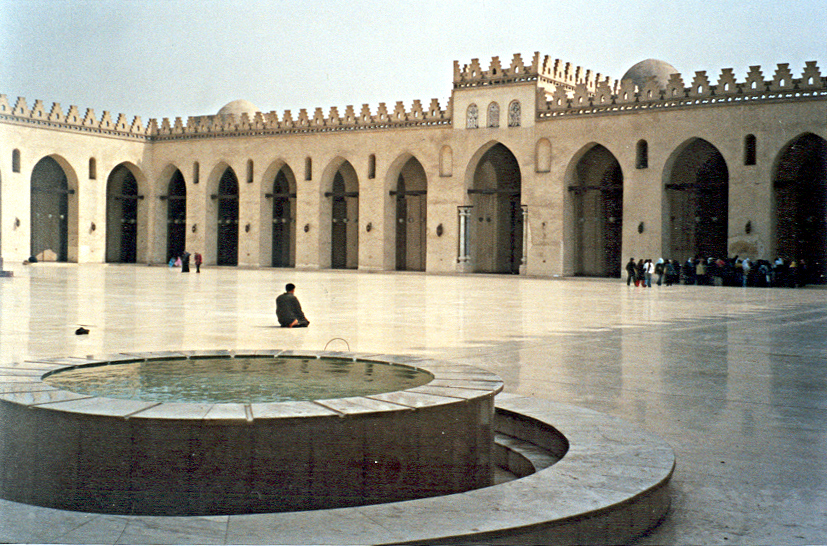
Al-Hakim Mosque, Cairo (1013)

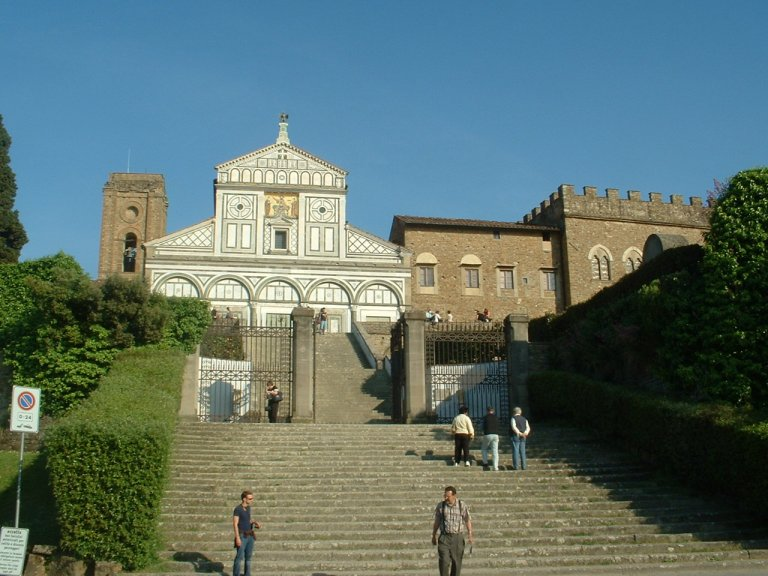
San Miniato al Monte, Florence (1013)

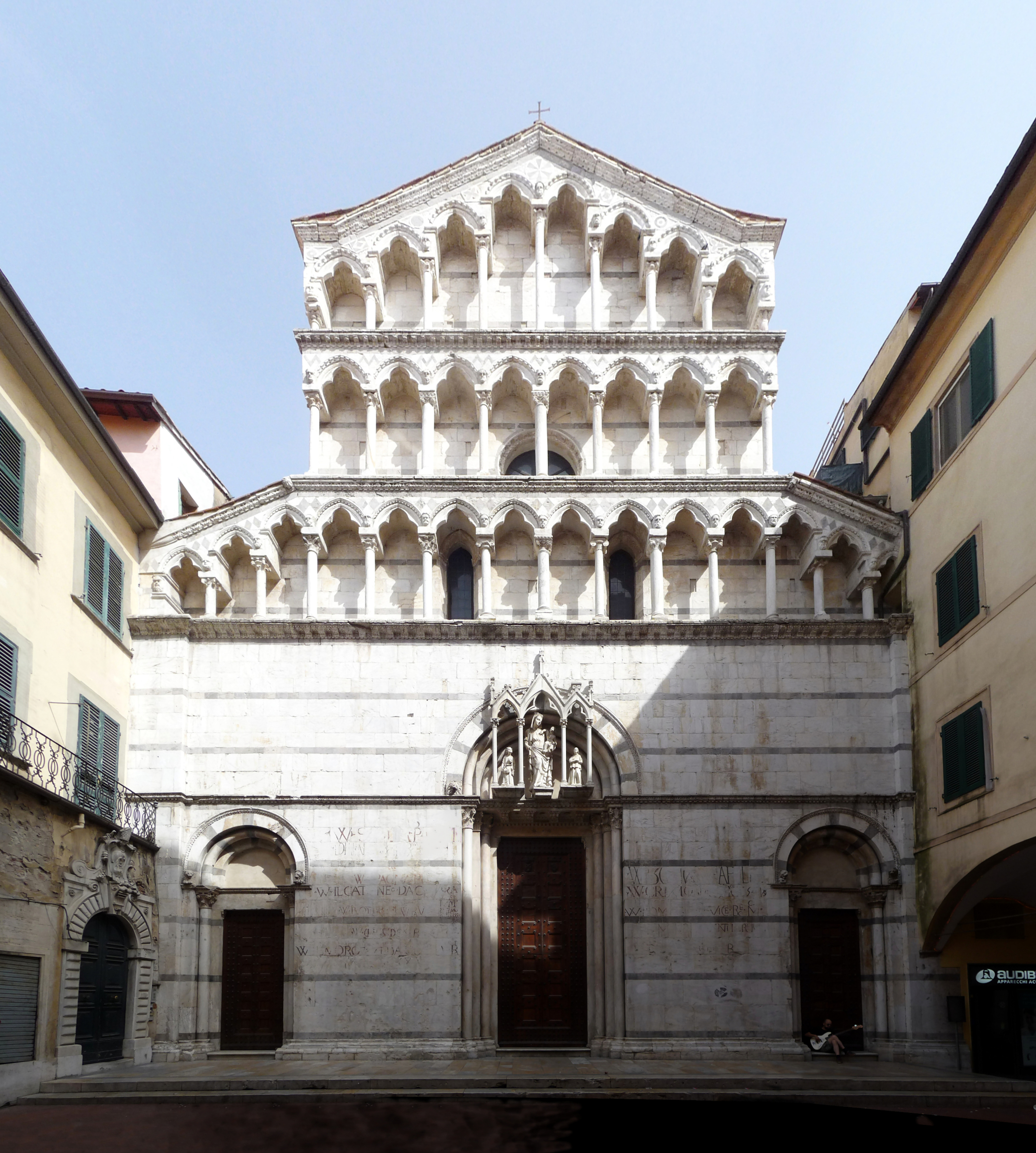
San Michele in Borgo, Pisa (1016)

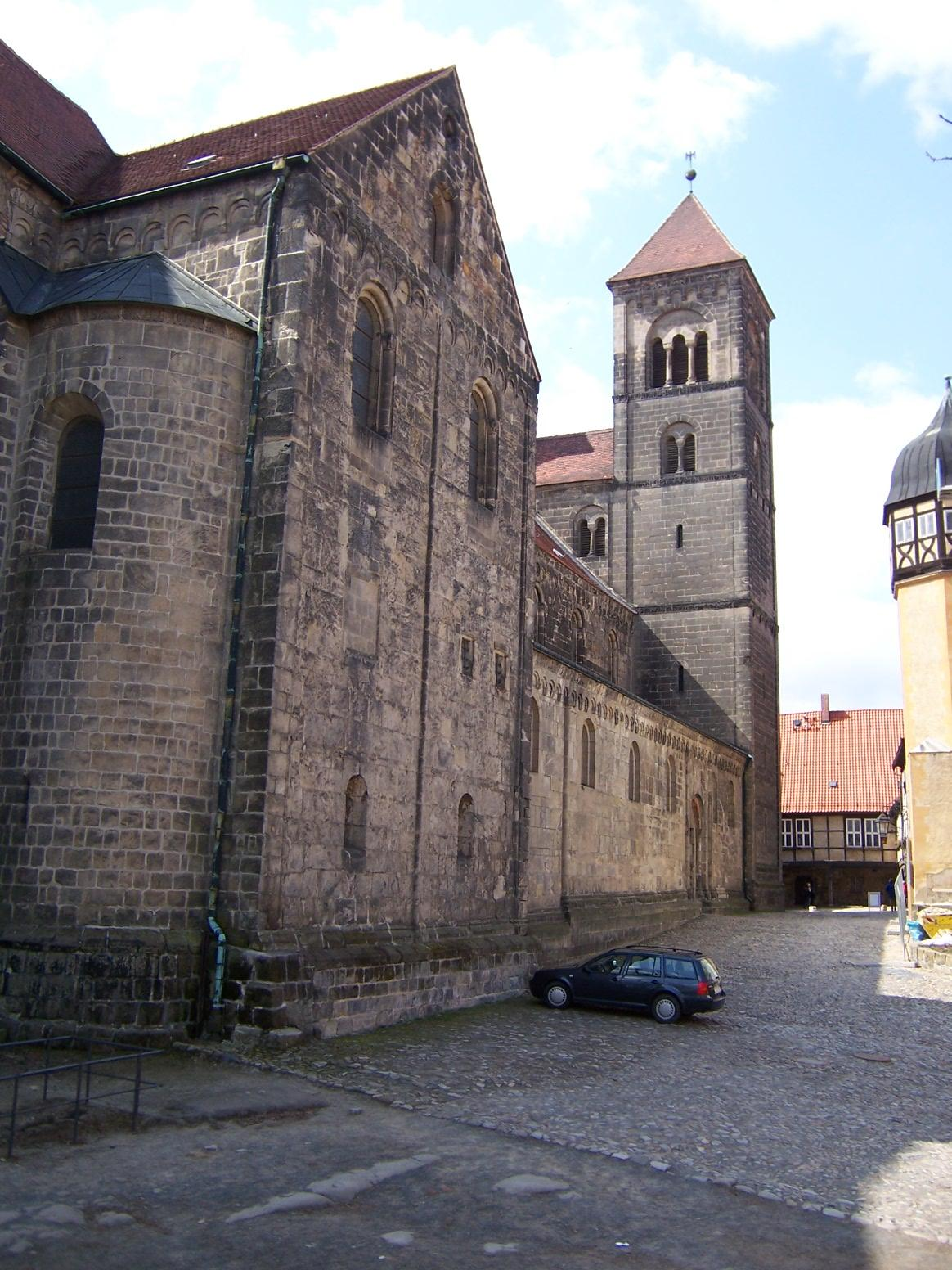
Quedlinburg Abbey (1021)

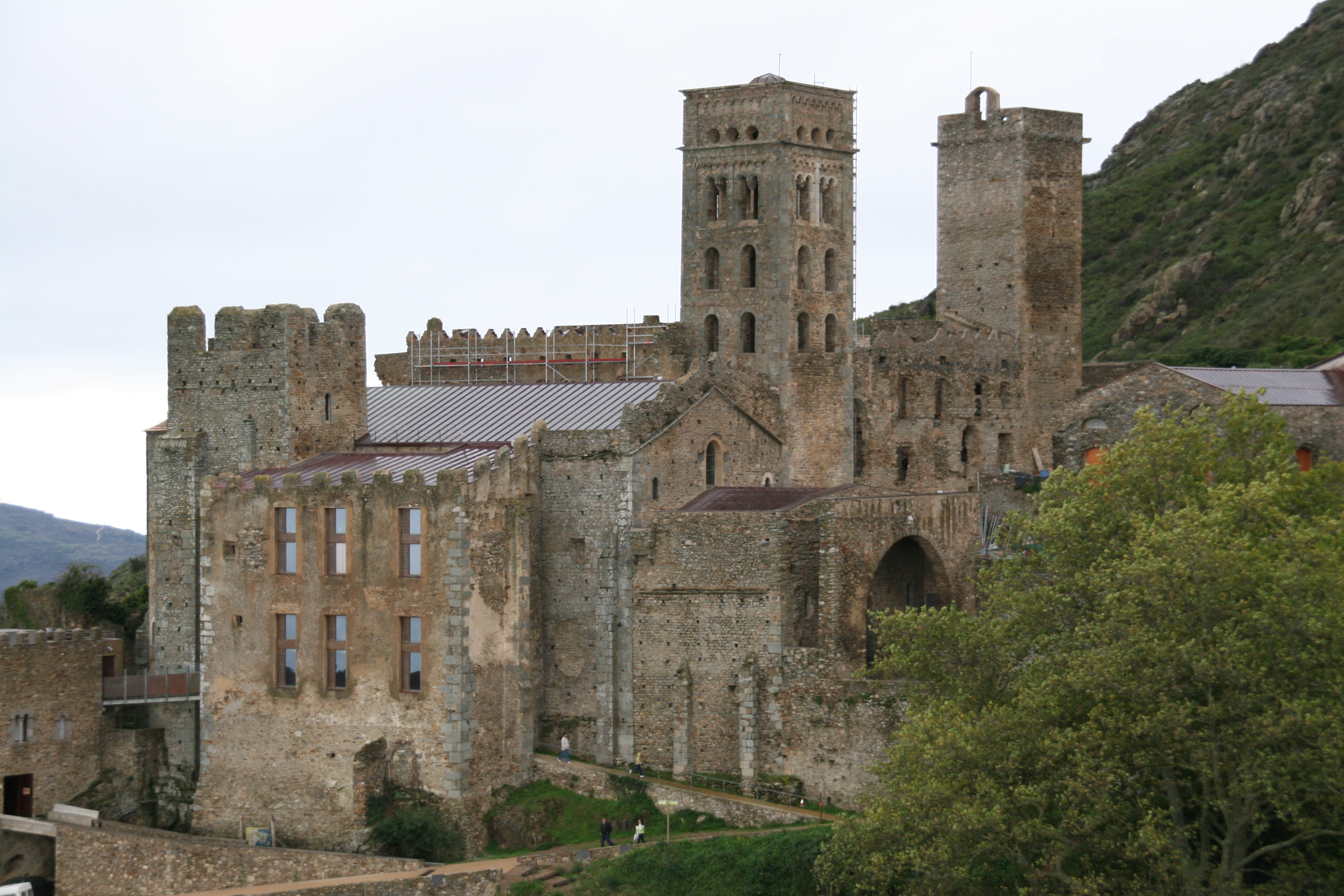
Monastery of Sant Pere de Rodes (1022)

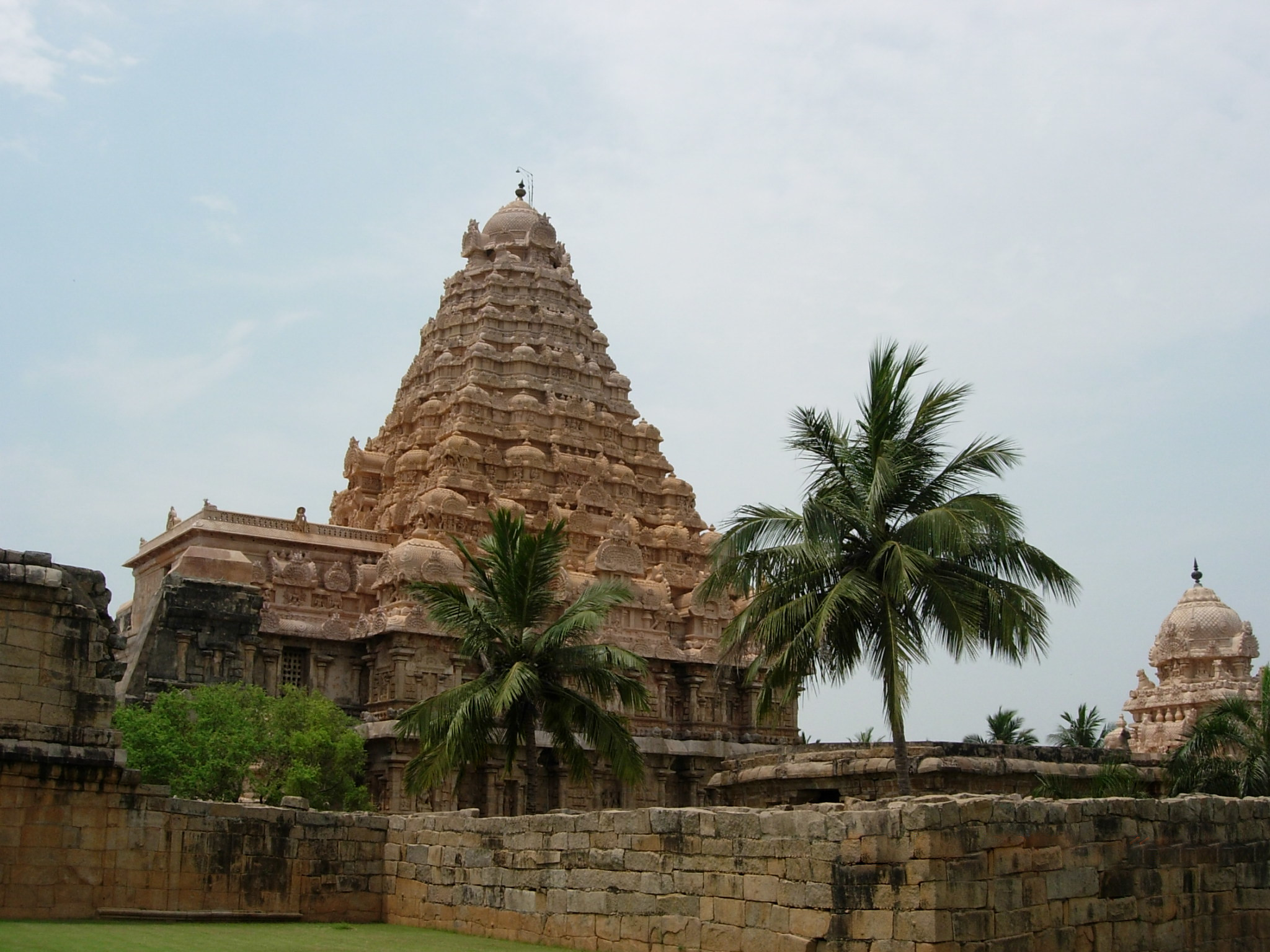
Temple in Gangaikonda Cholapuram (1025)

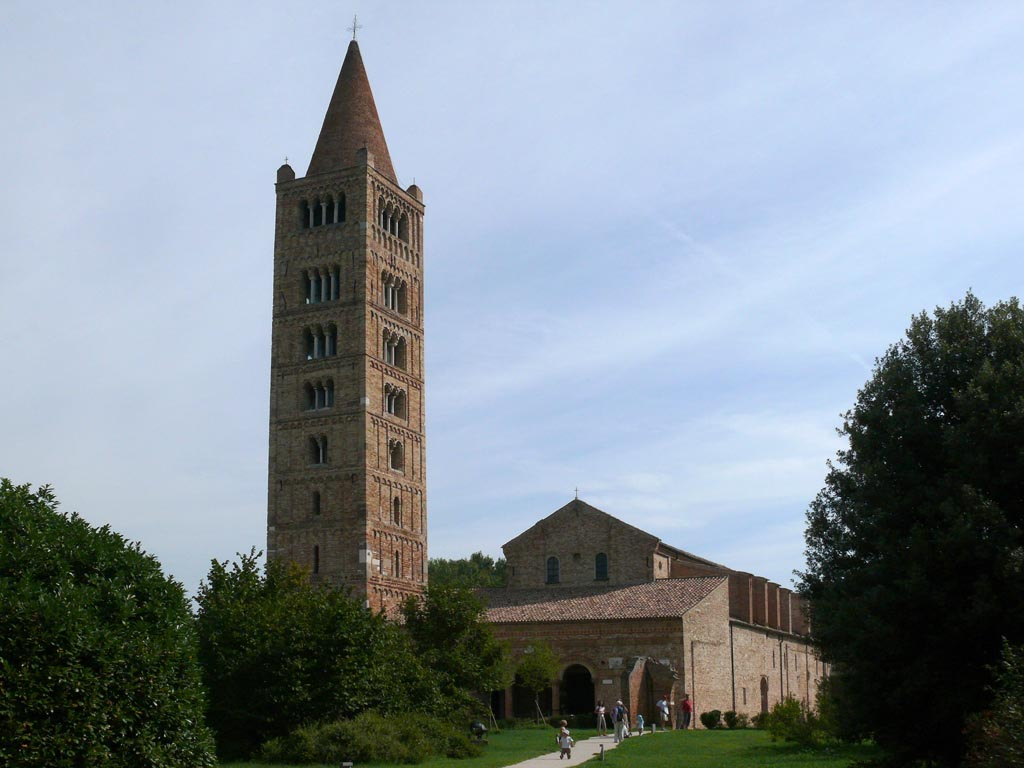
Pomposa Abbey (1026)

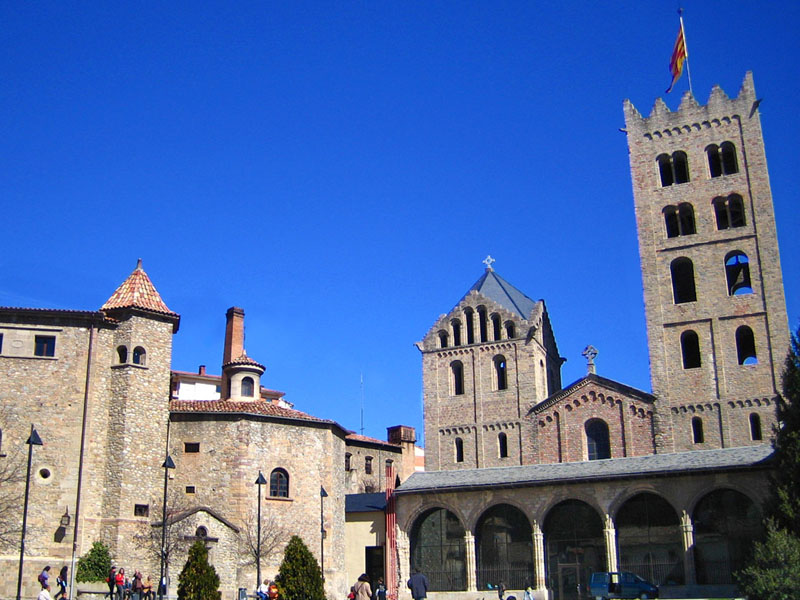
Santa Maria de Ripoll (1032)

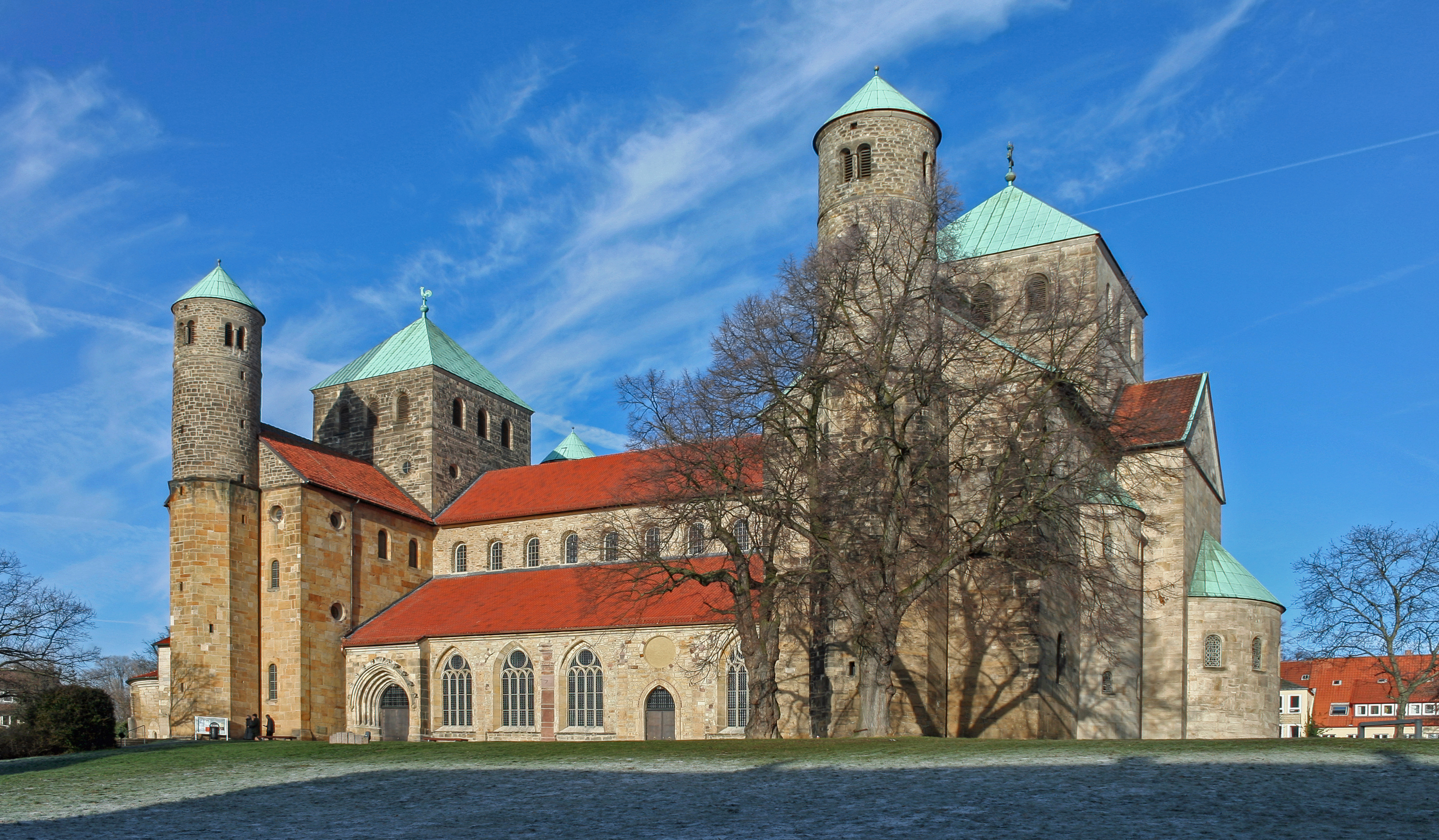
St. Michael's Church, Hildesheim (1033)

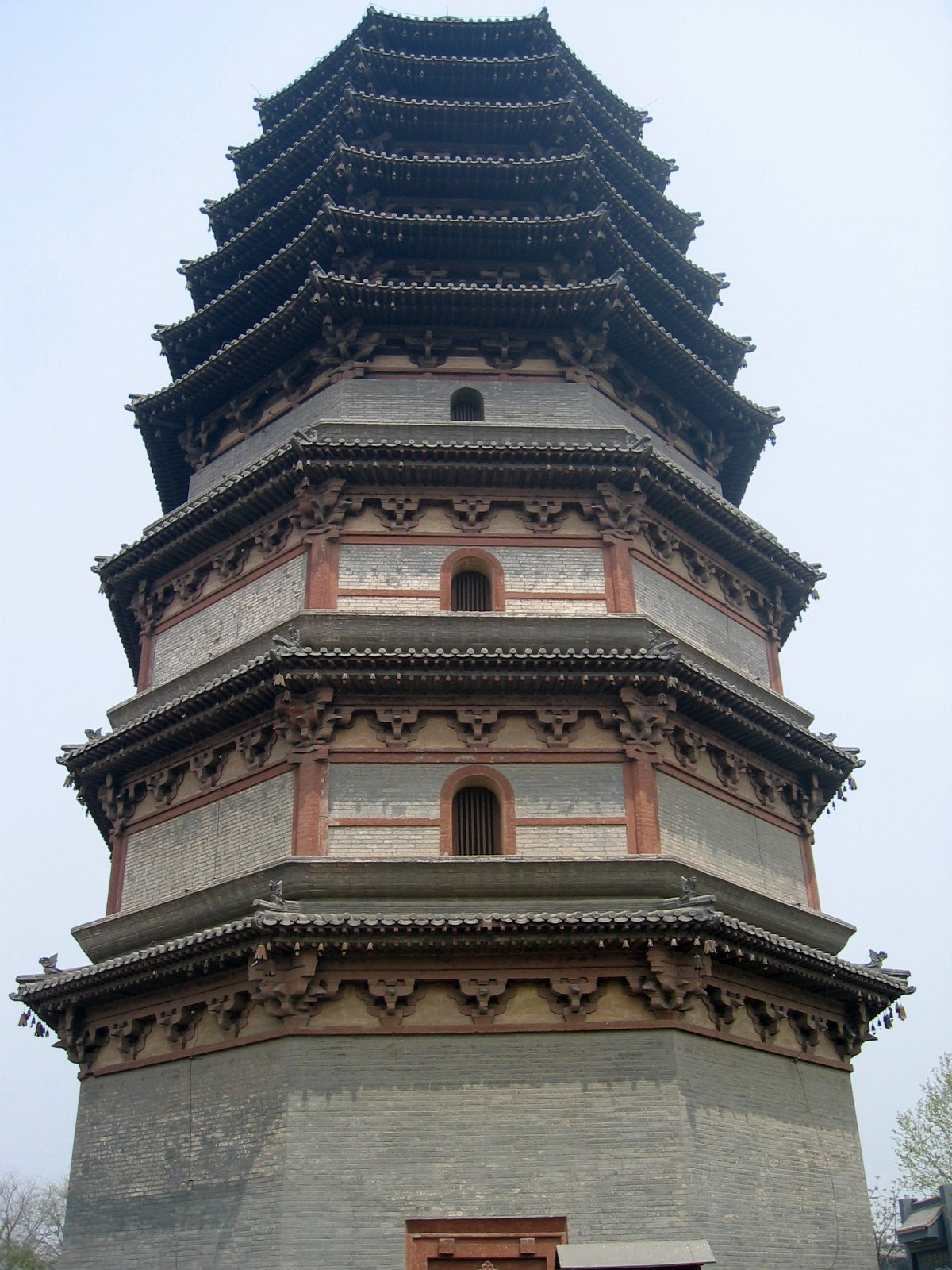
The Lingxiao Pagoda of Zhengding (1045)

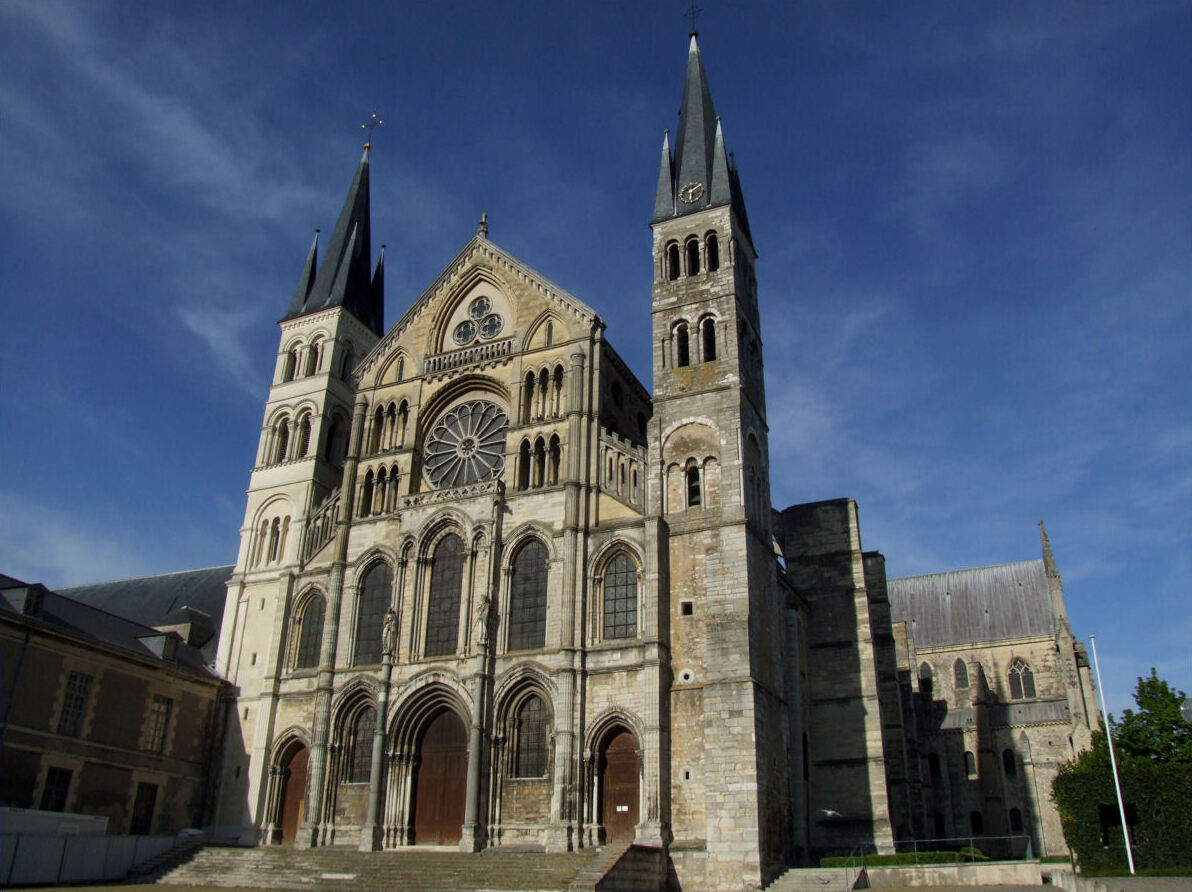
Saint Rémi of Reims Basilica (1049)

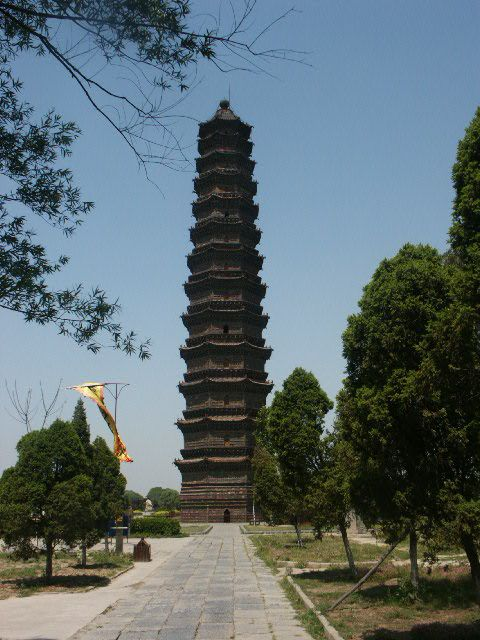
The Iron Pagoda of Kaifeng (1049)

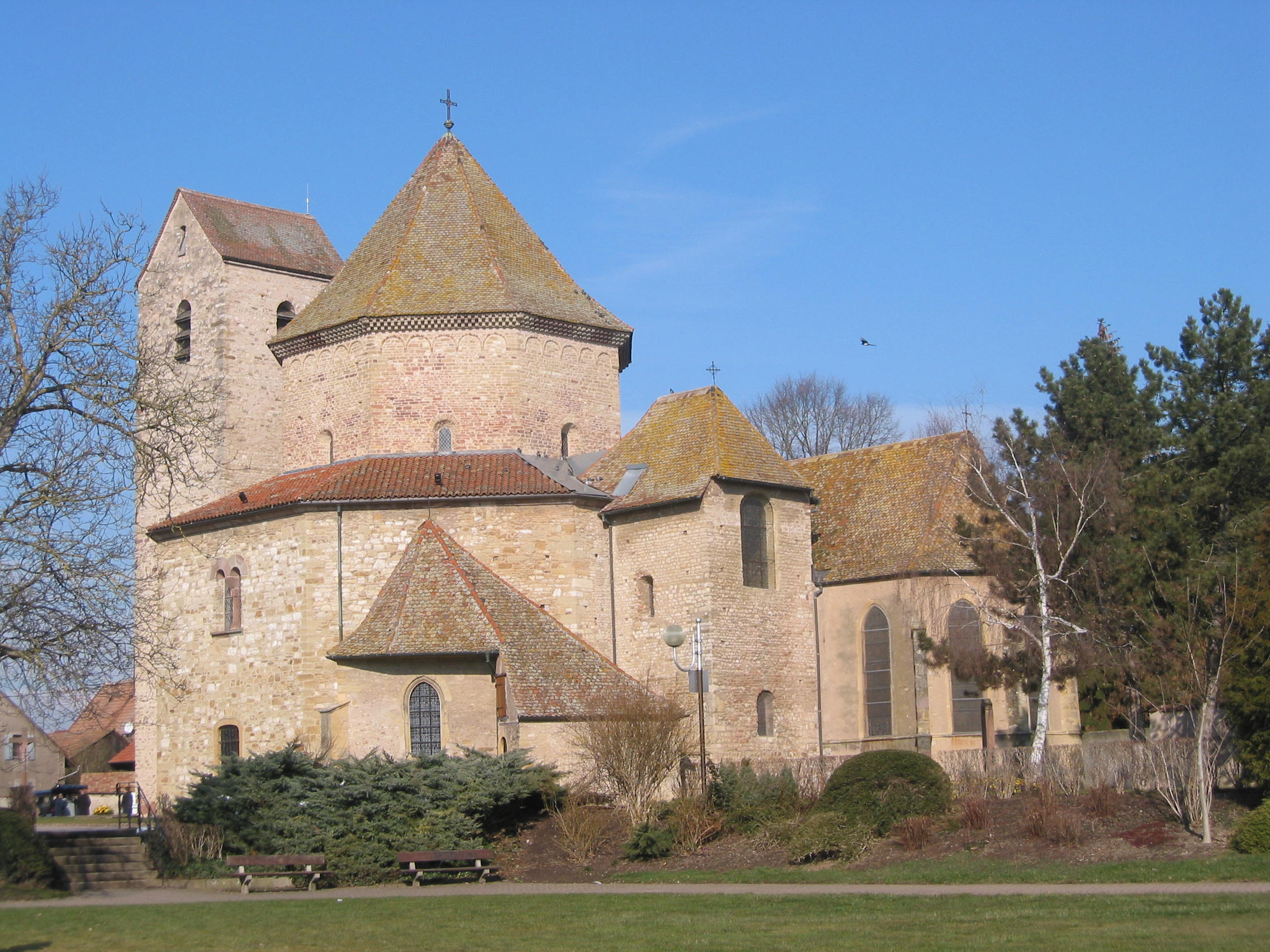
Ottmarsheim Abbey Church (1049)

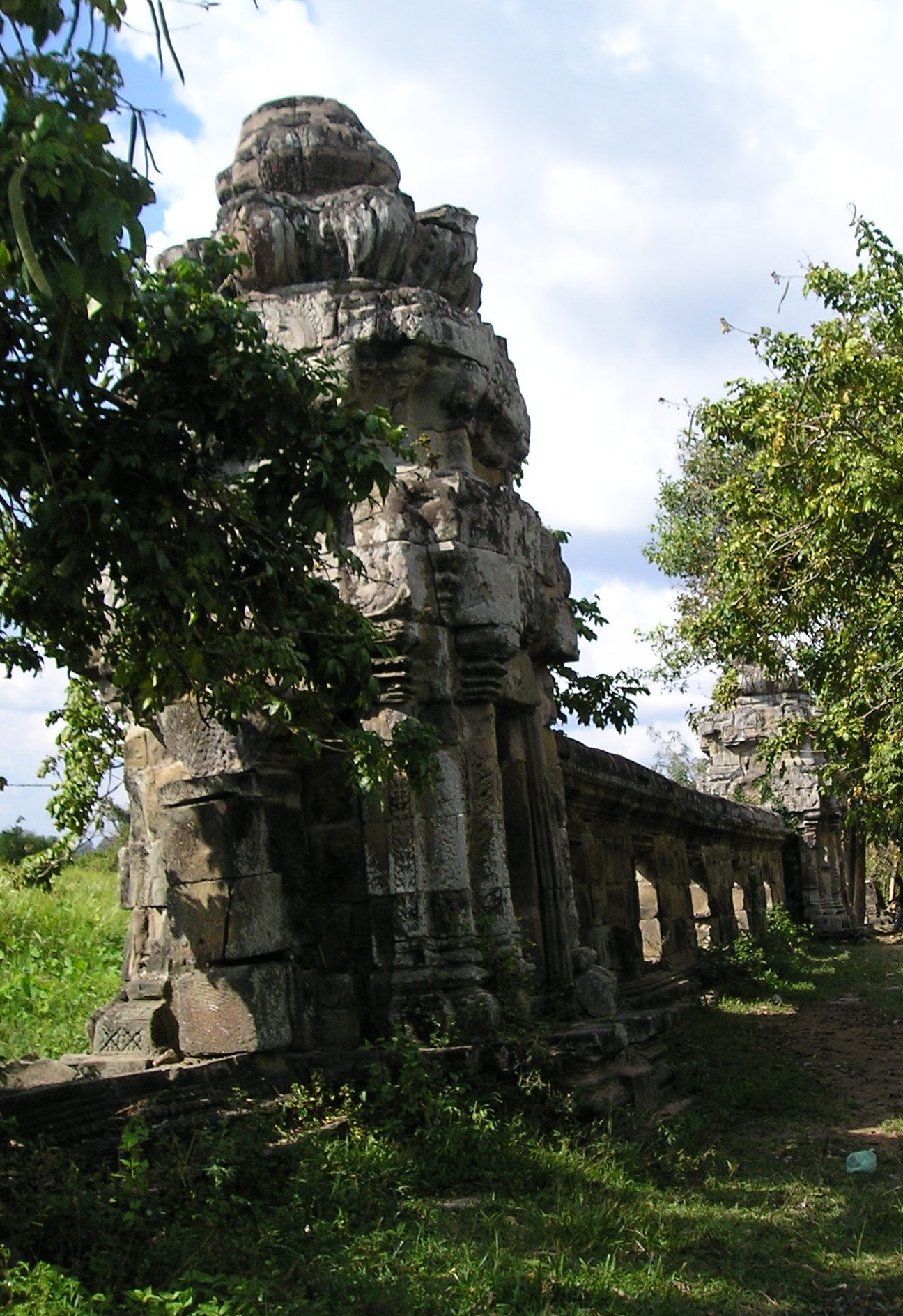
West Mebon, Angkor (c. 1050)

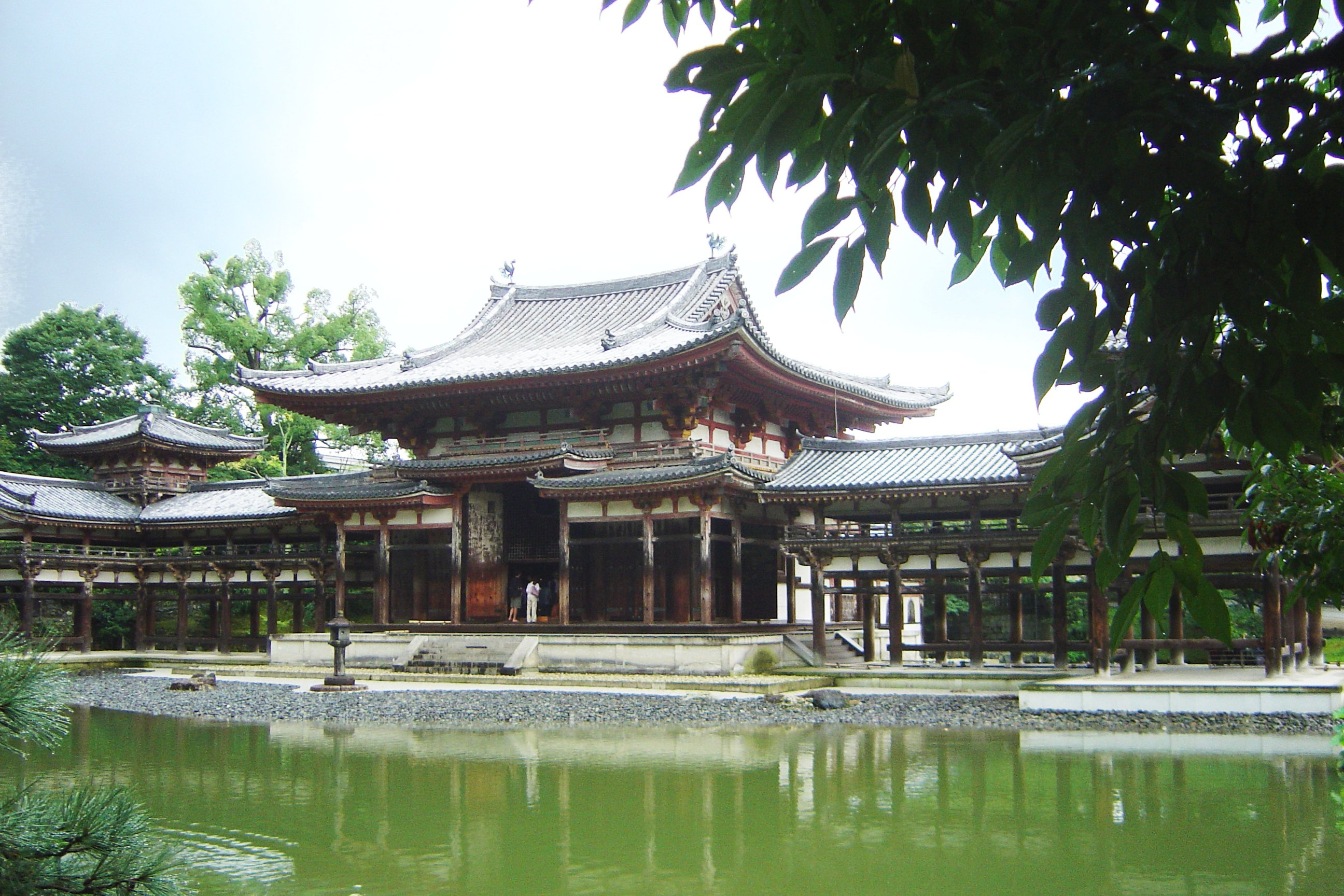
Phoenix Hall of the Byōdō-in, Kyōto (1053)

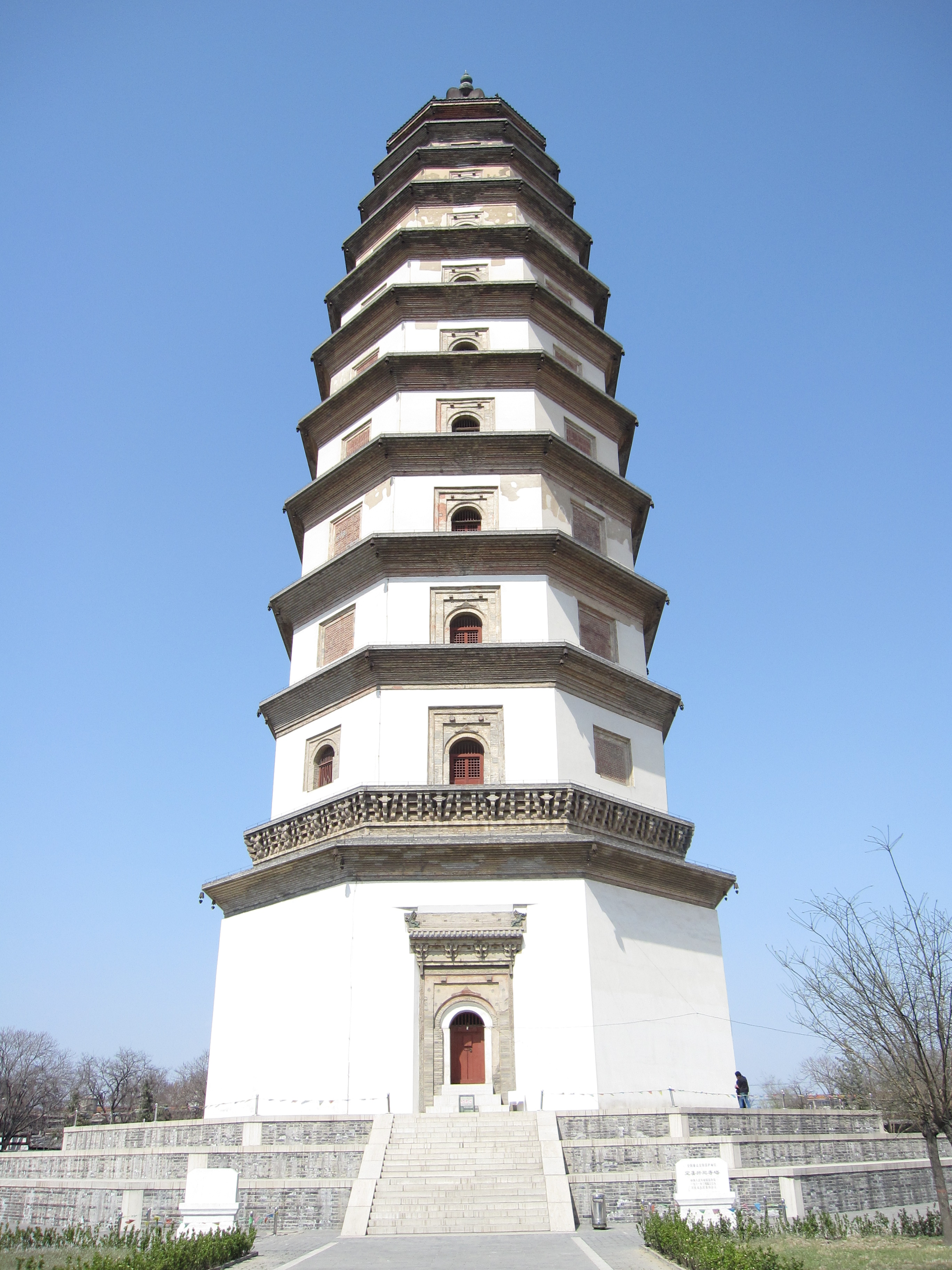
The Liaodi Pagoda of Kaiyuan Temple in Dingzhou (1055)

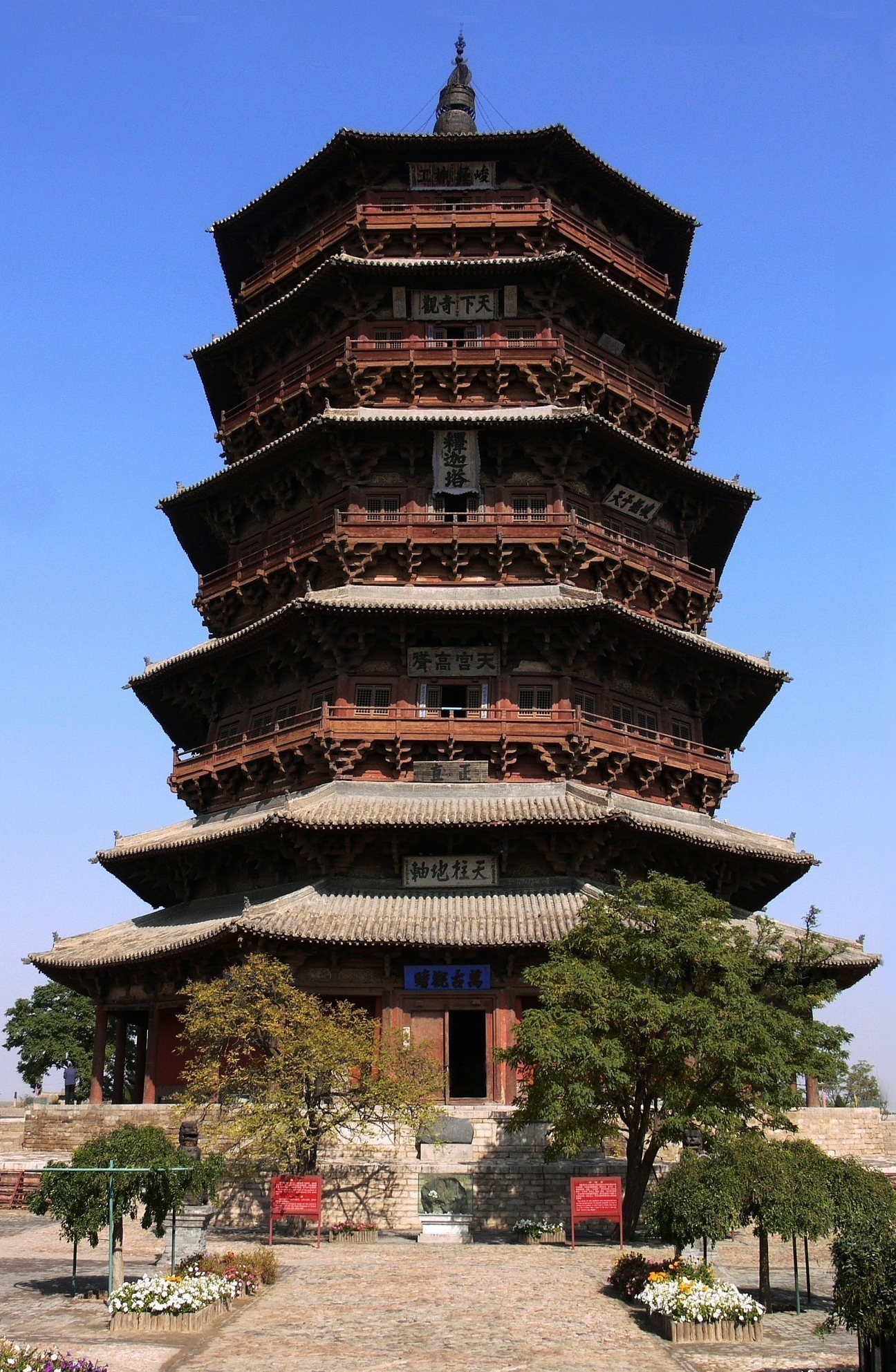
Pagoda of Fogong Temple (1056)

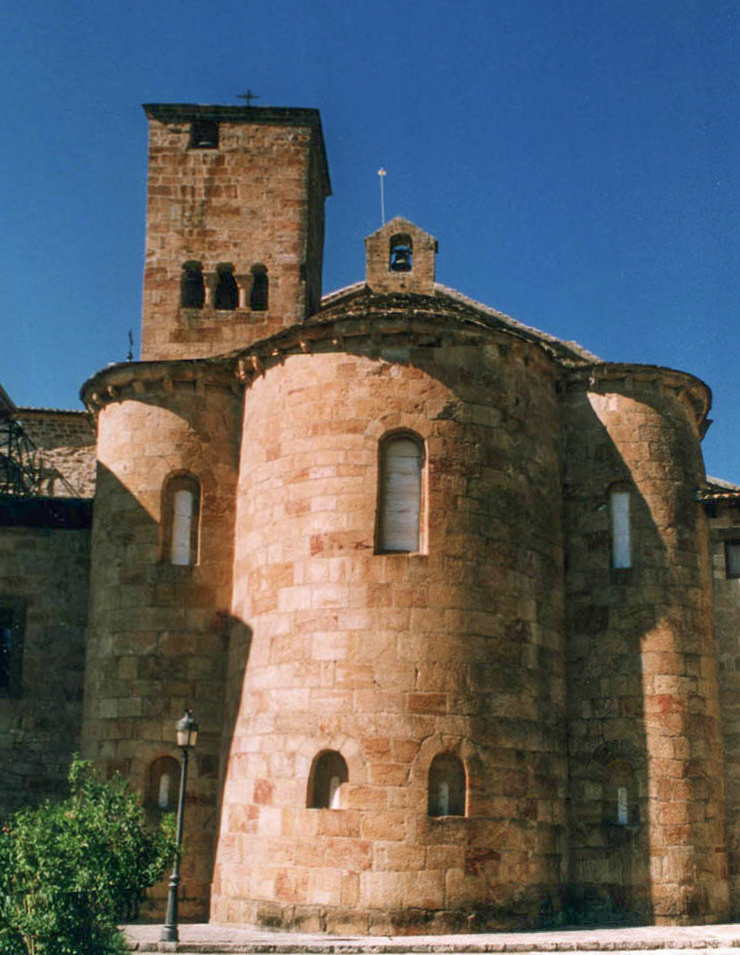
Monastery of San Salvador Church, Leyre (1057)

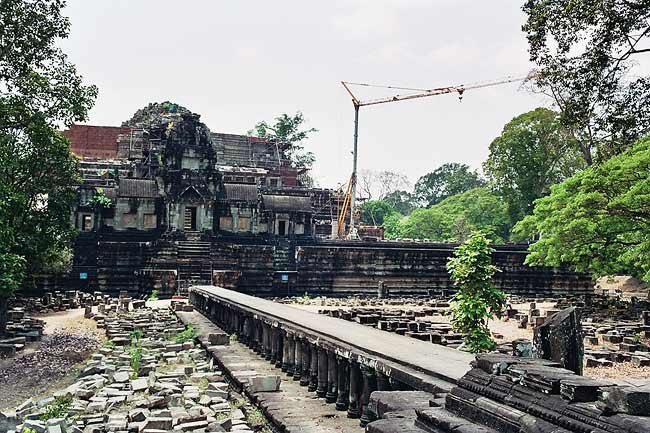
Baphuon of Yasodharapura (c. 1060)

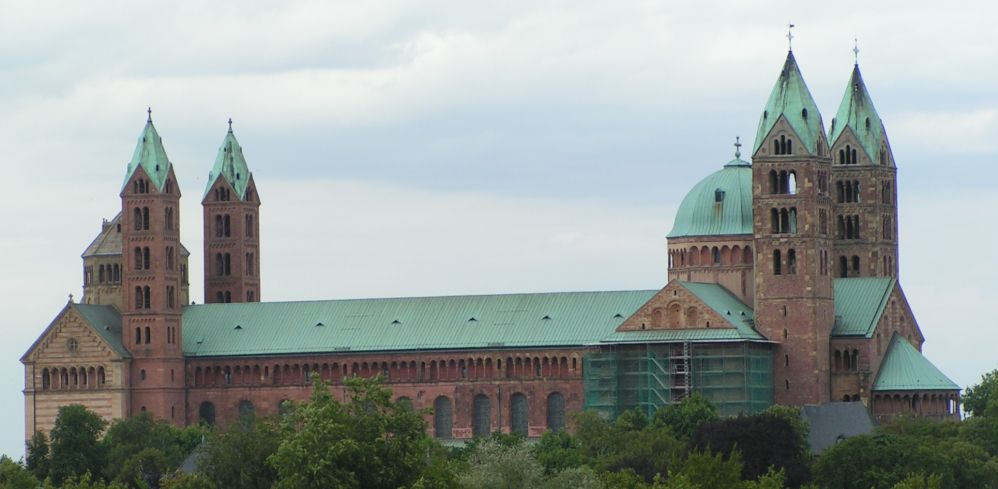
Speyer Cathedral (1061)

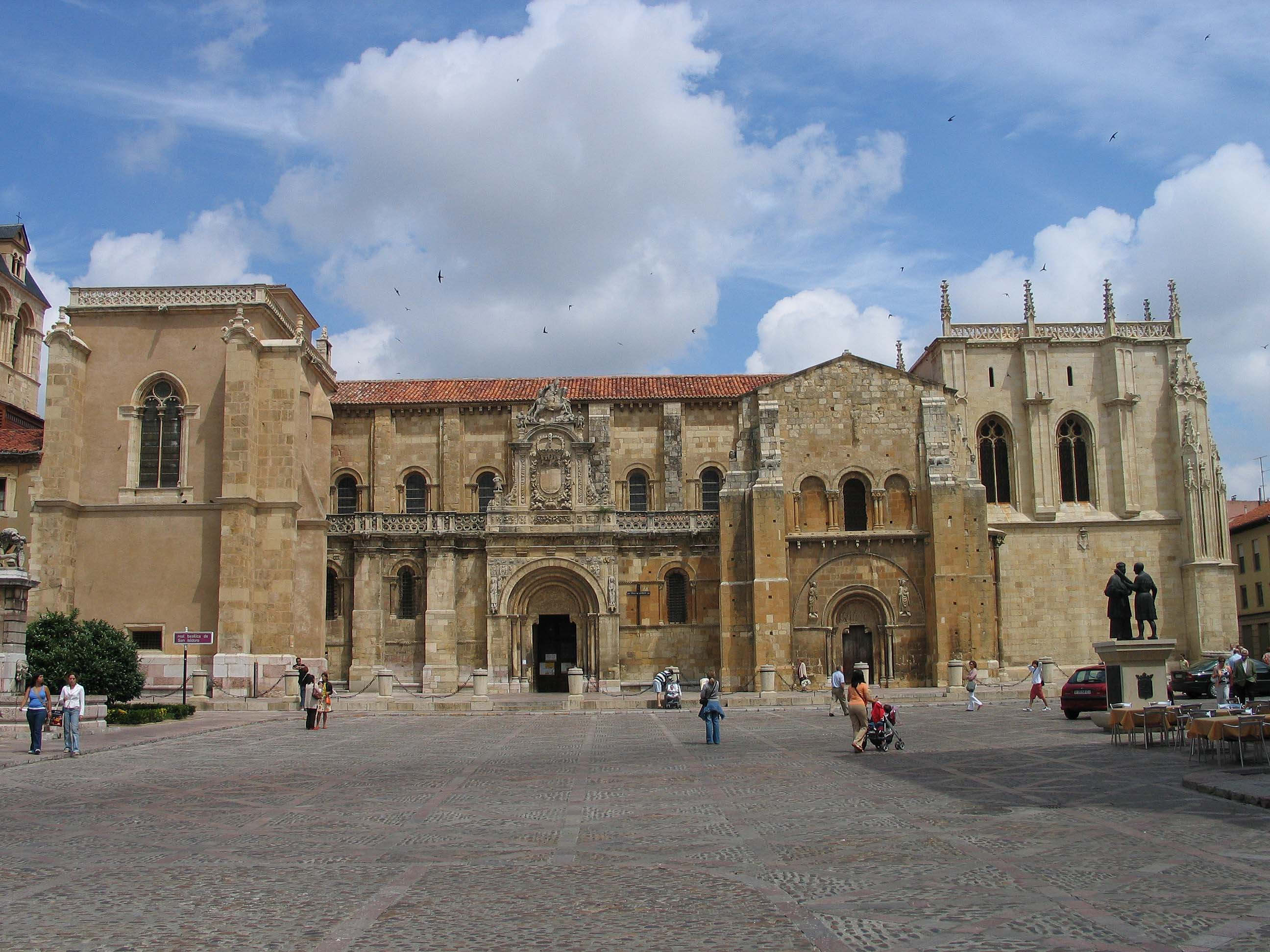
Basilica of San Isidoro, León (1063)

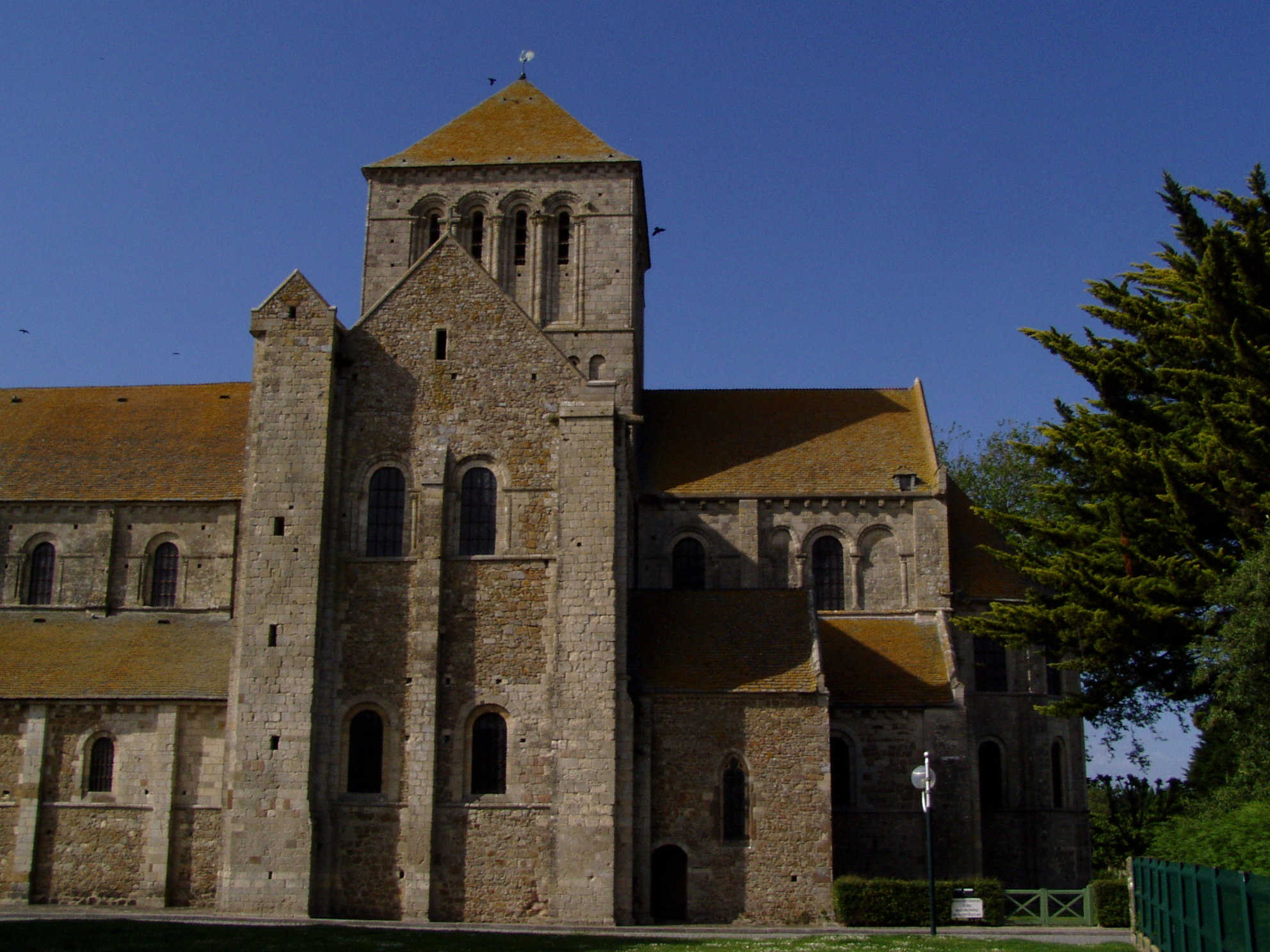
Abbey of Lessay

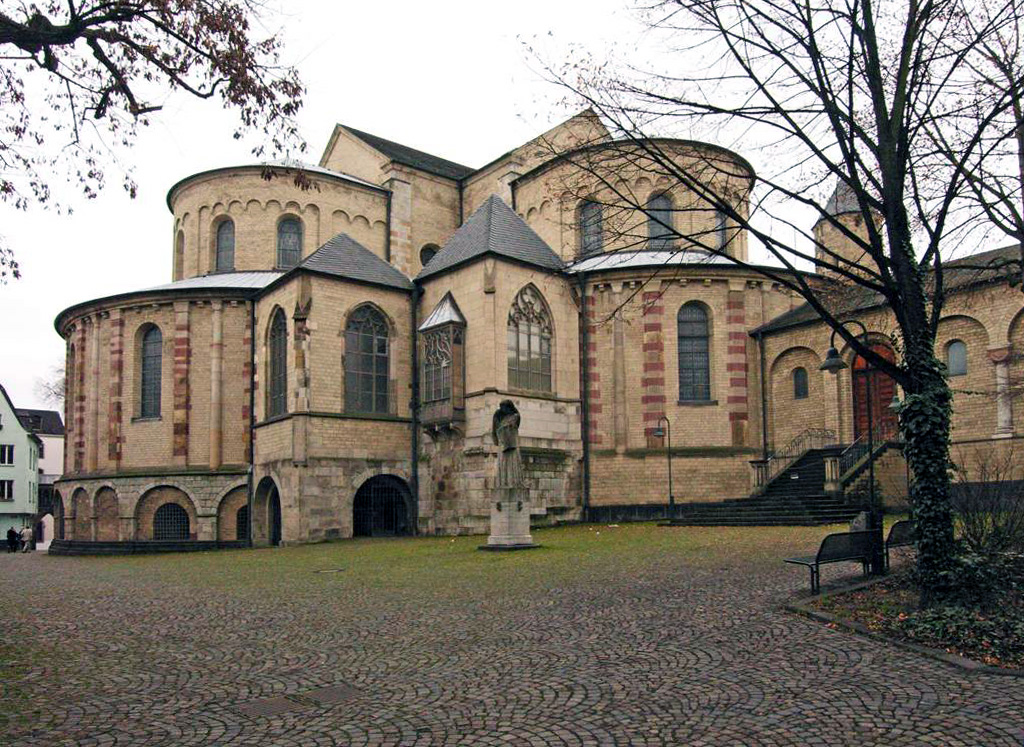
Sankt Maria im Kapitol, Cologne (1065)

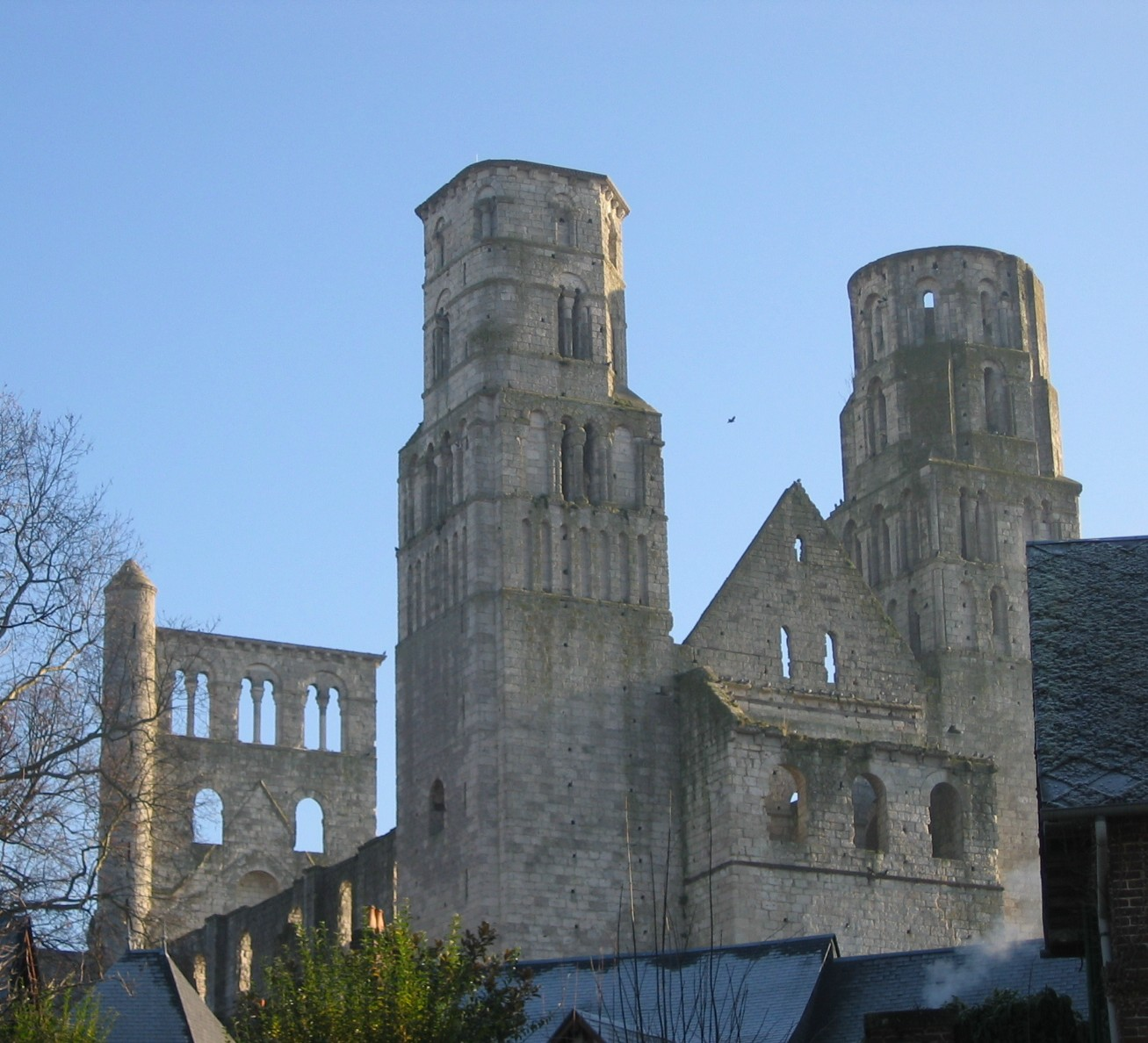
Abbey of Jumièges (1067)

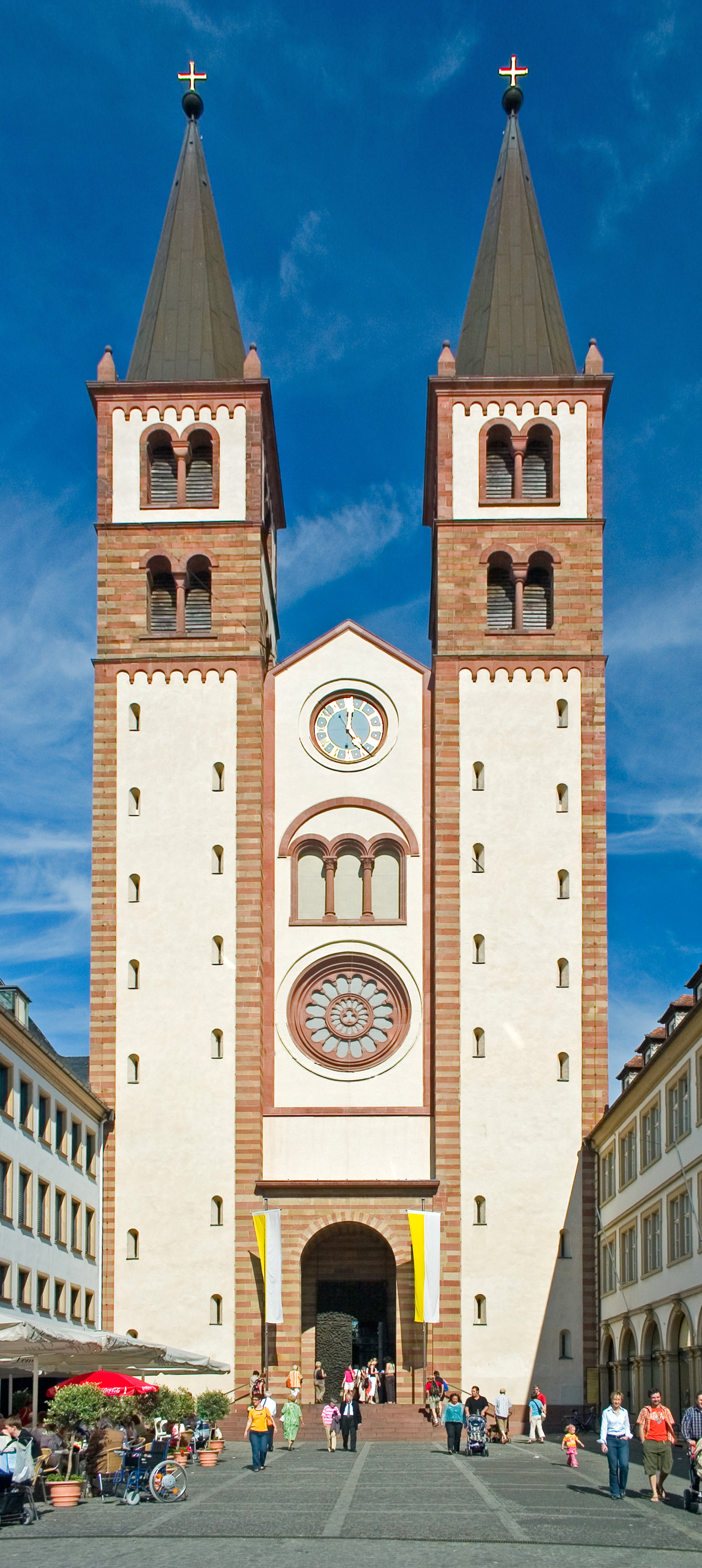
Würzburg Cathedral (1075)

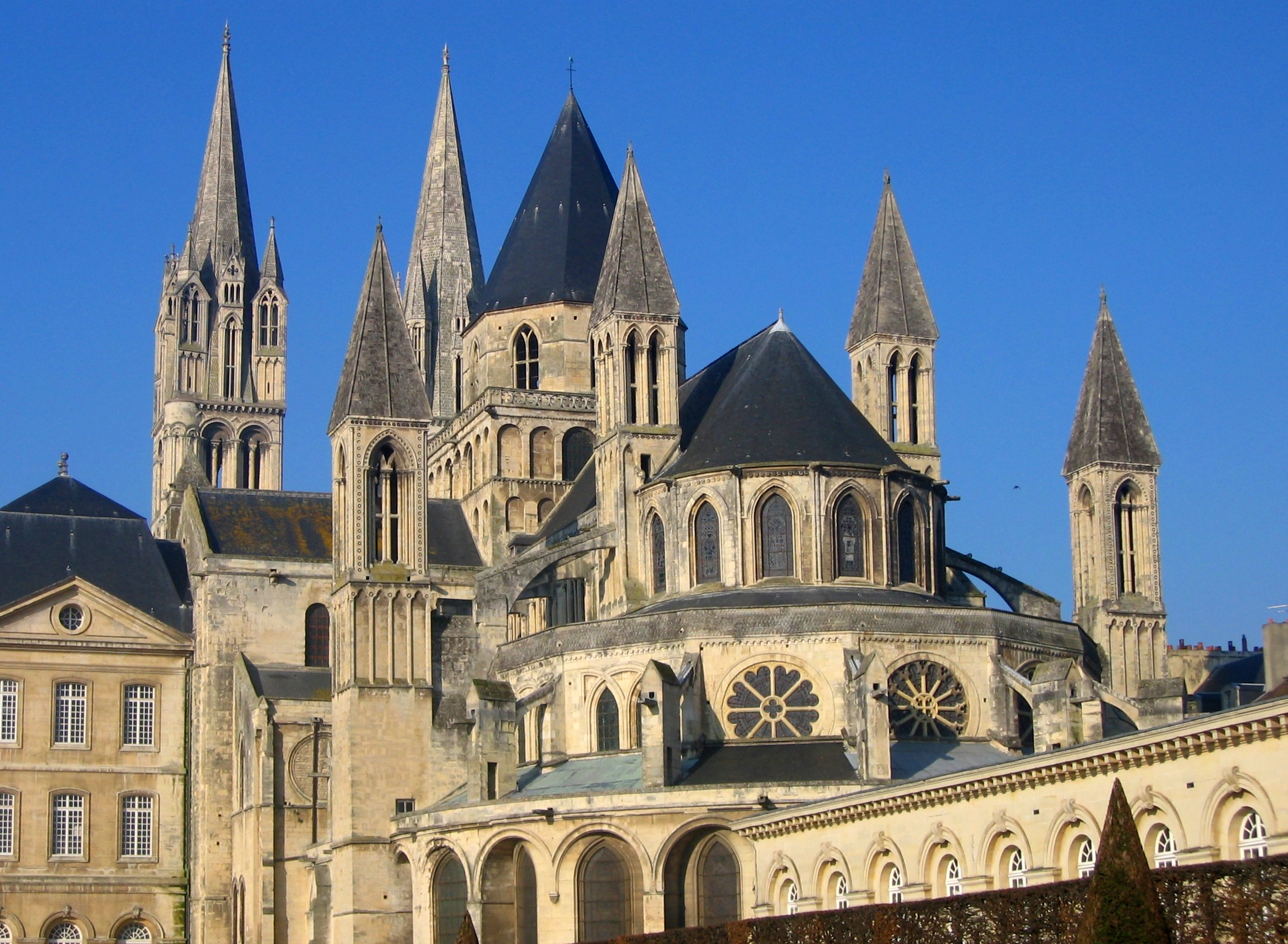
Abbaye-aux-Hommes (1077)

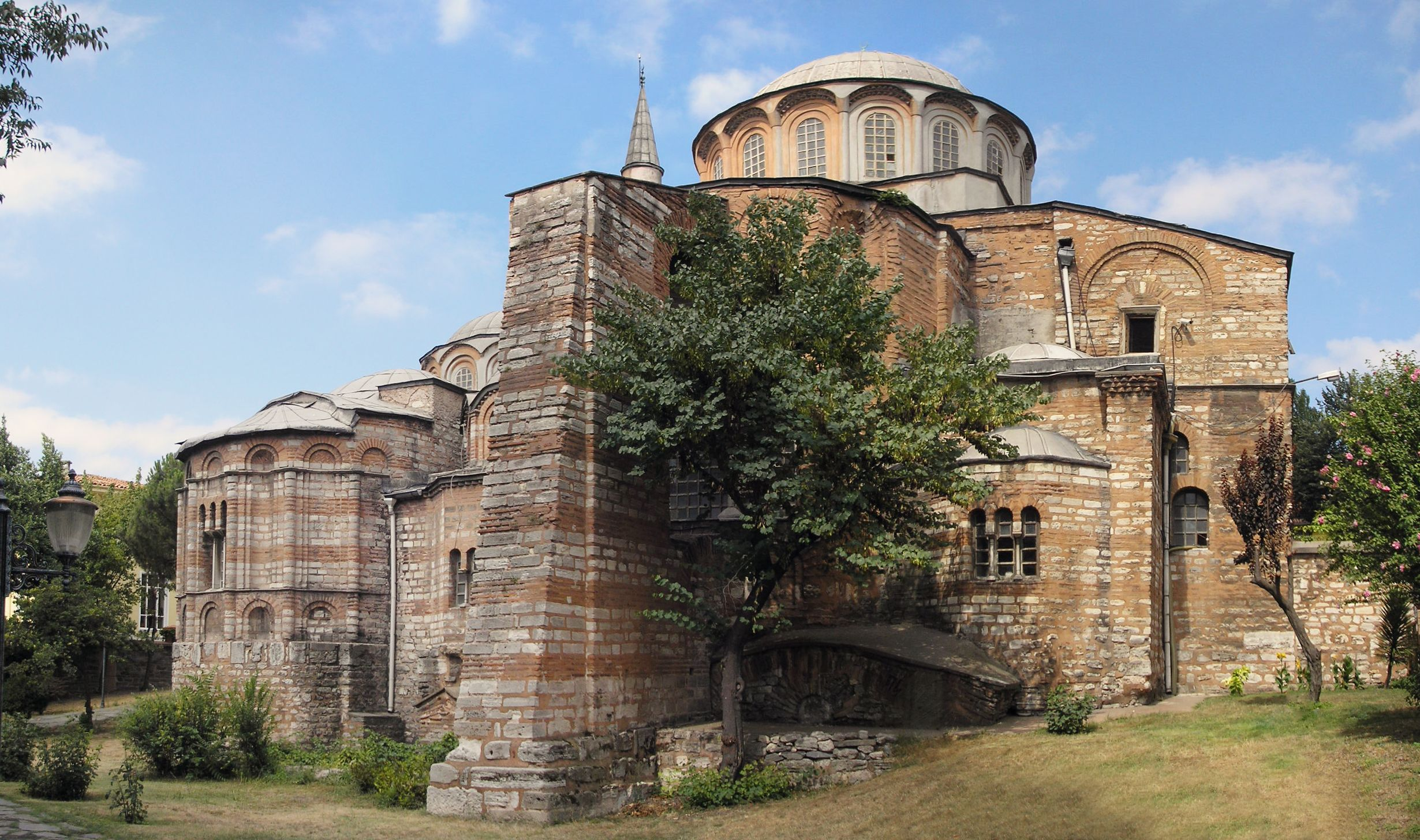
Chora Church (1081)

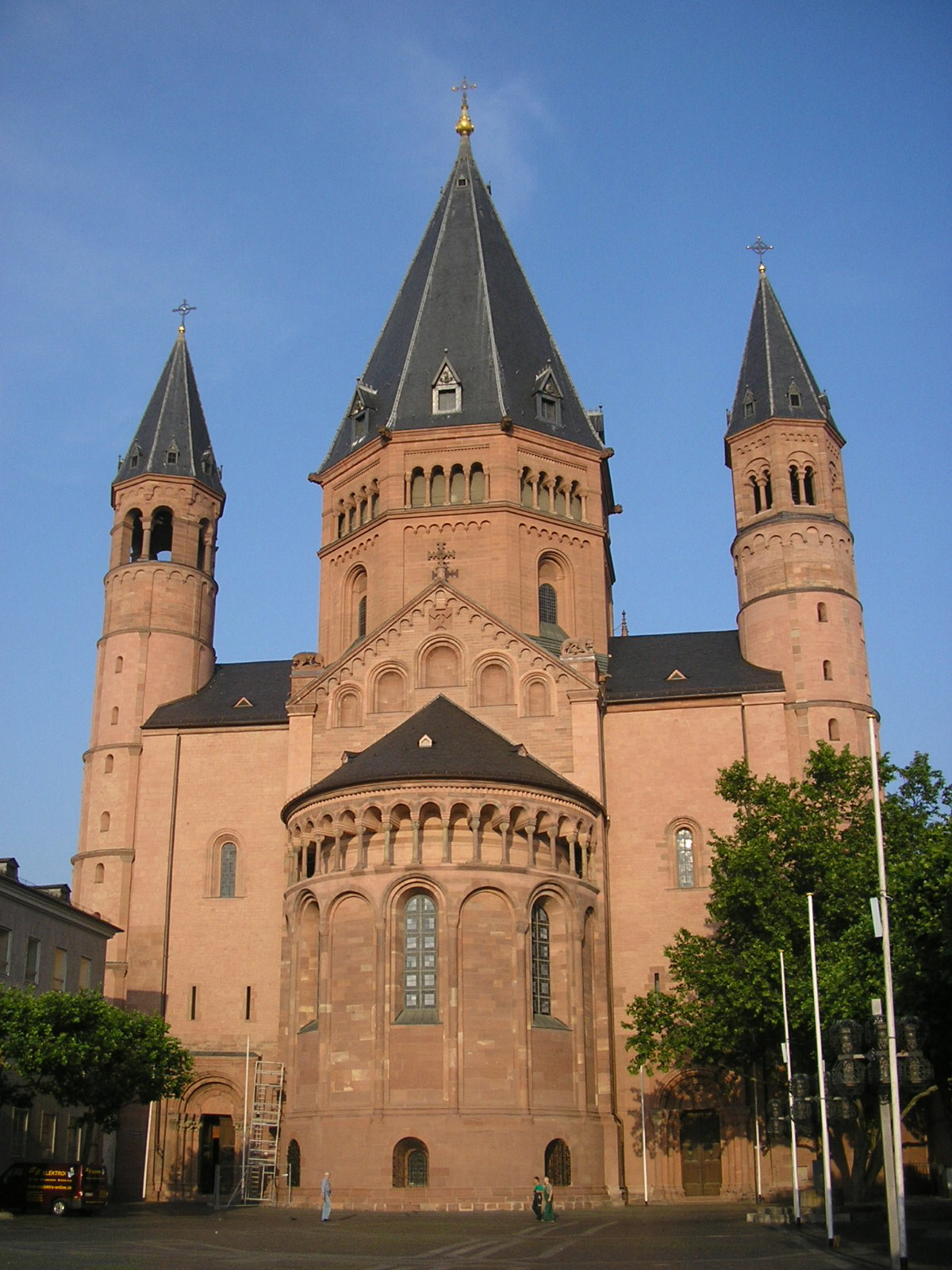
Romanesque Mainz Cathedral (begun 1081)

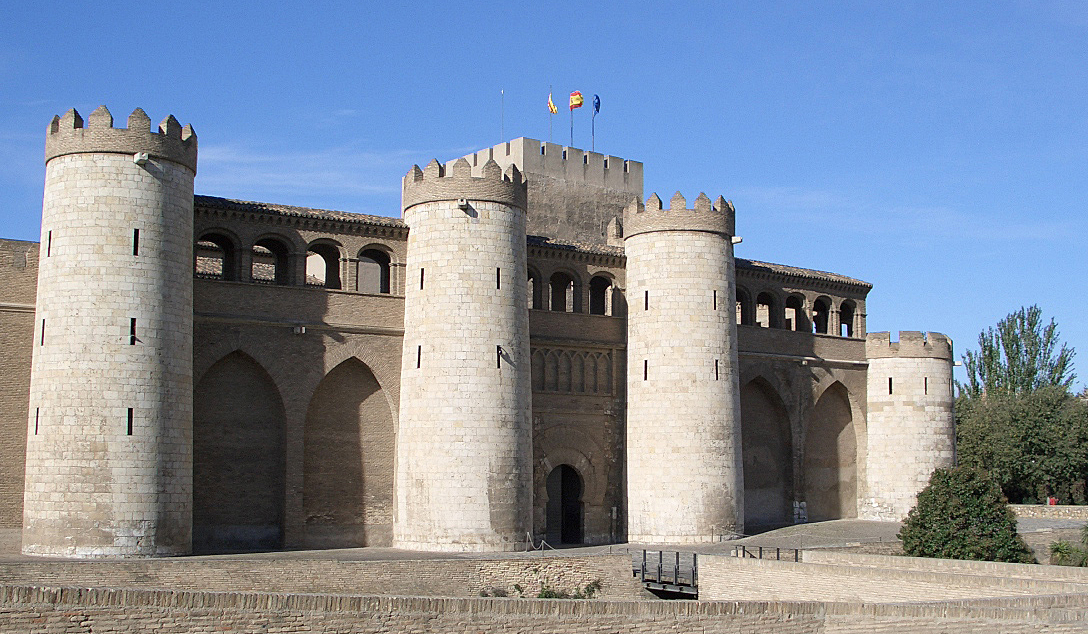
Aljaferia Palace of Zaragoza (1081)

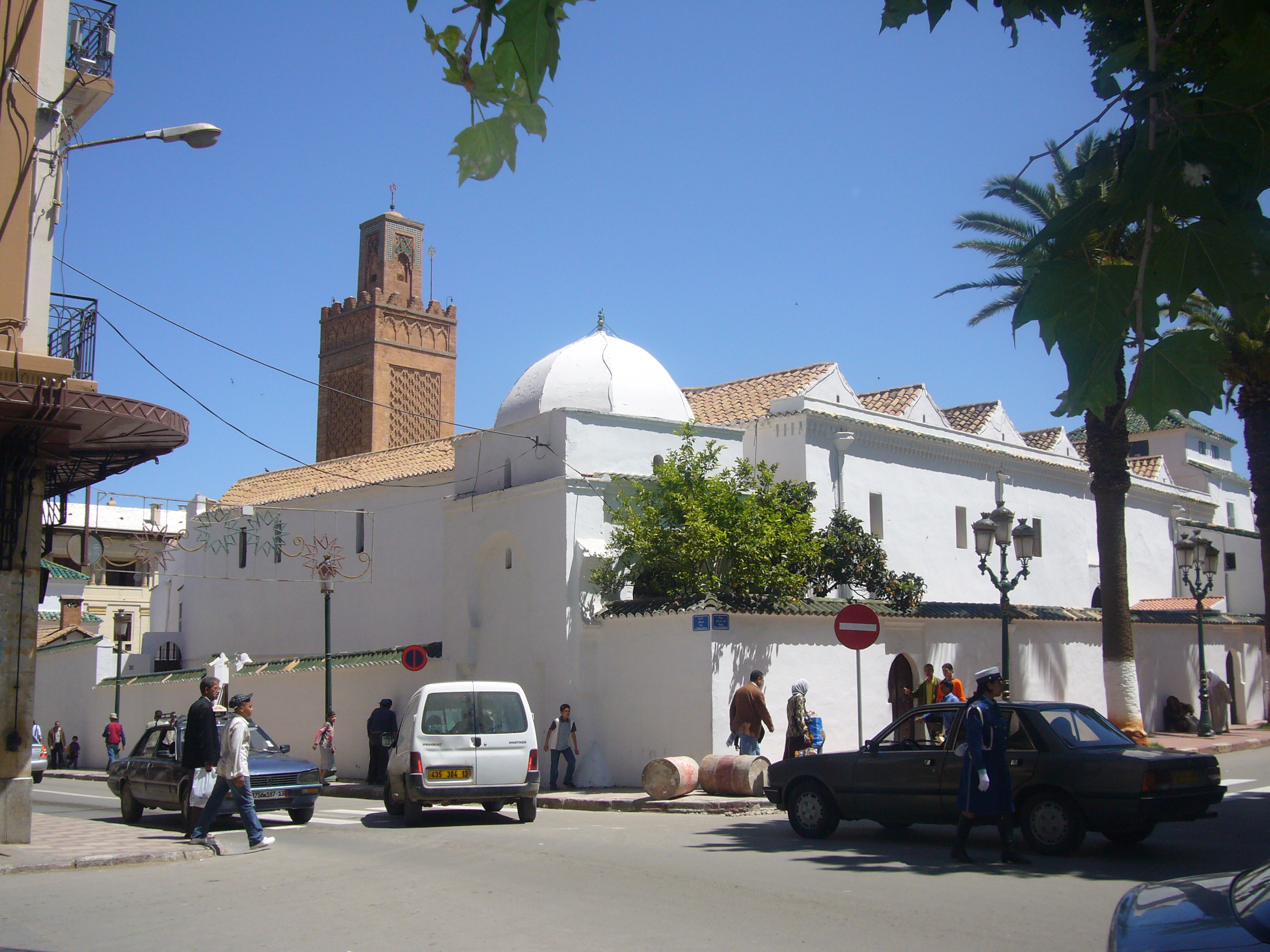
Great Mosque of Tlemcen (1082)

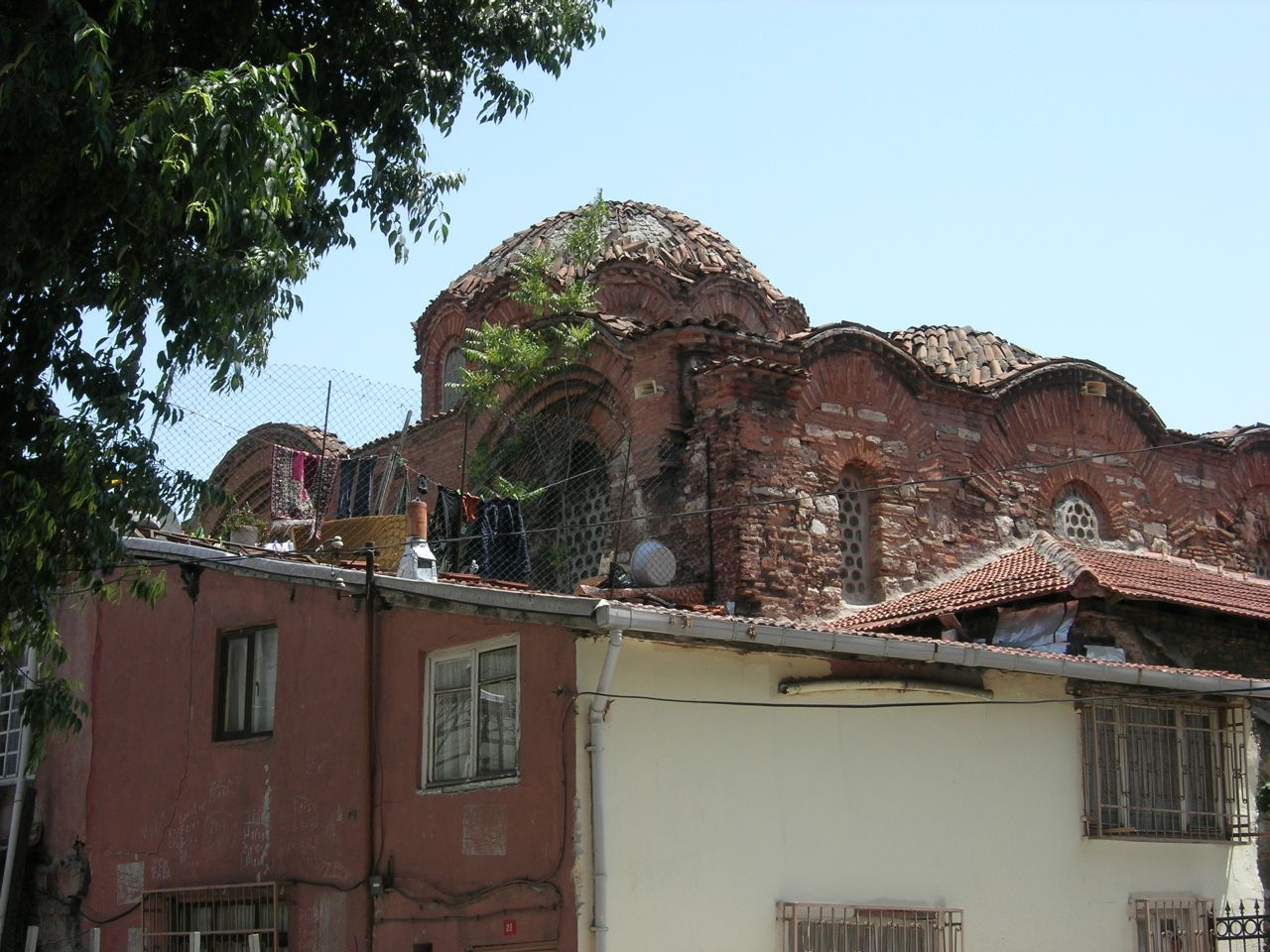
Church of Christ Pantepoptes (begun before 1087)

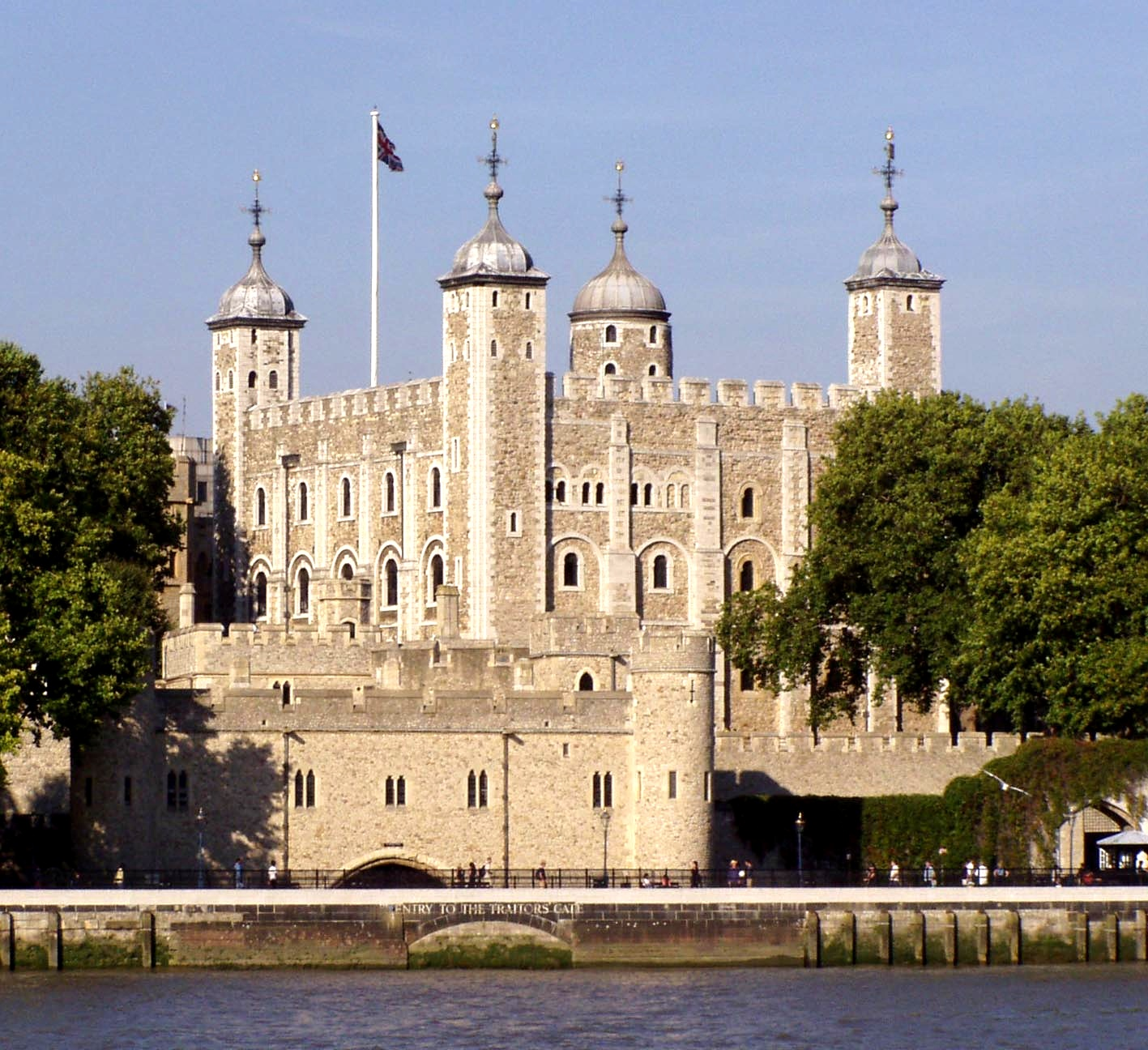
White Tower of London (1087)

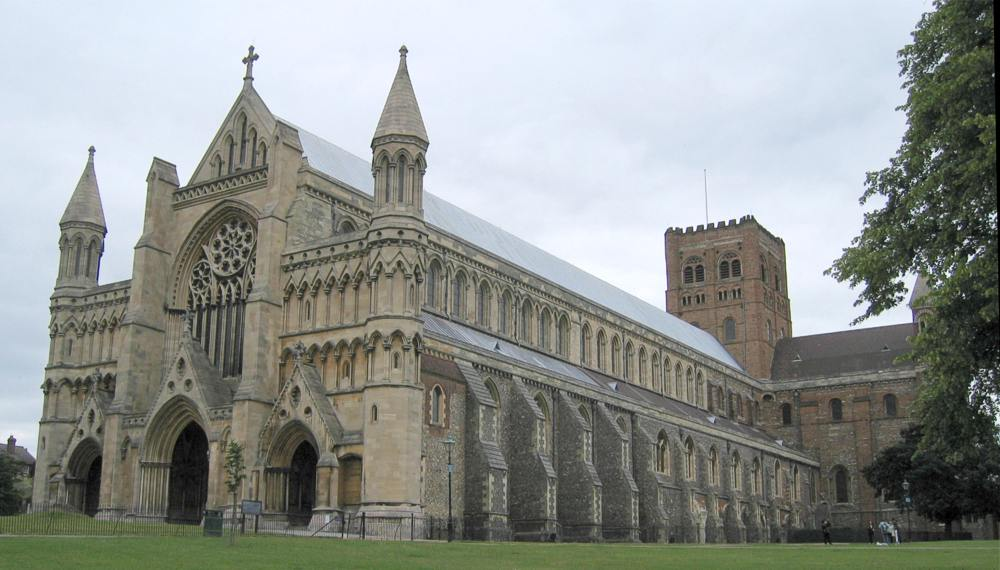
St Albans Cathedral (1089)

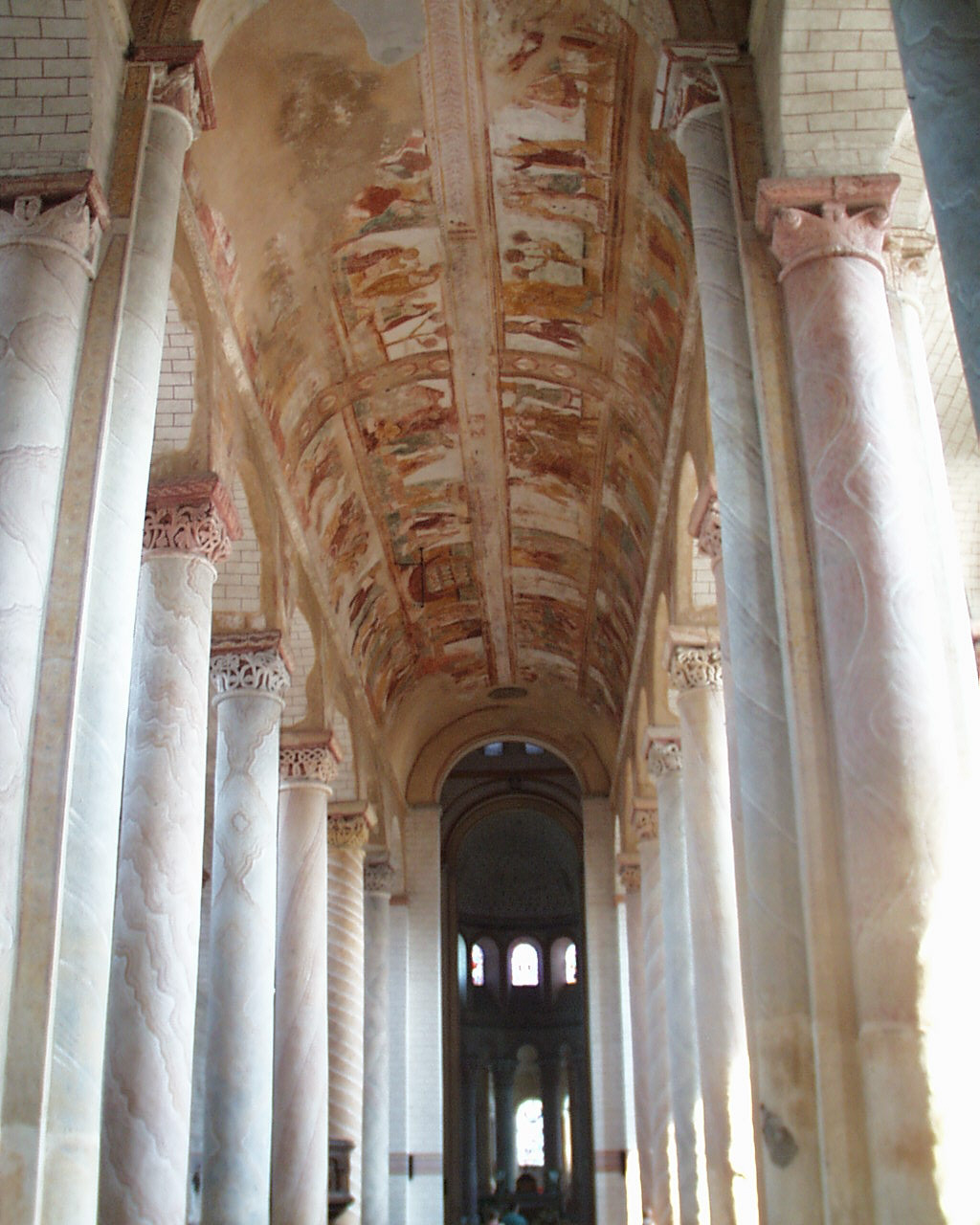
Abbey Church of Saint-Savin-sur-Gartempe (1090)

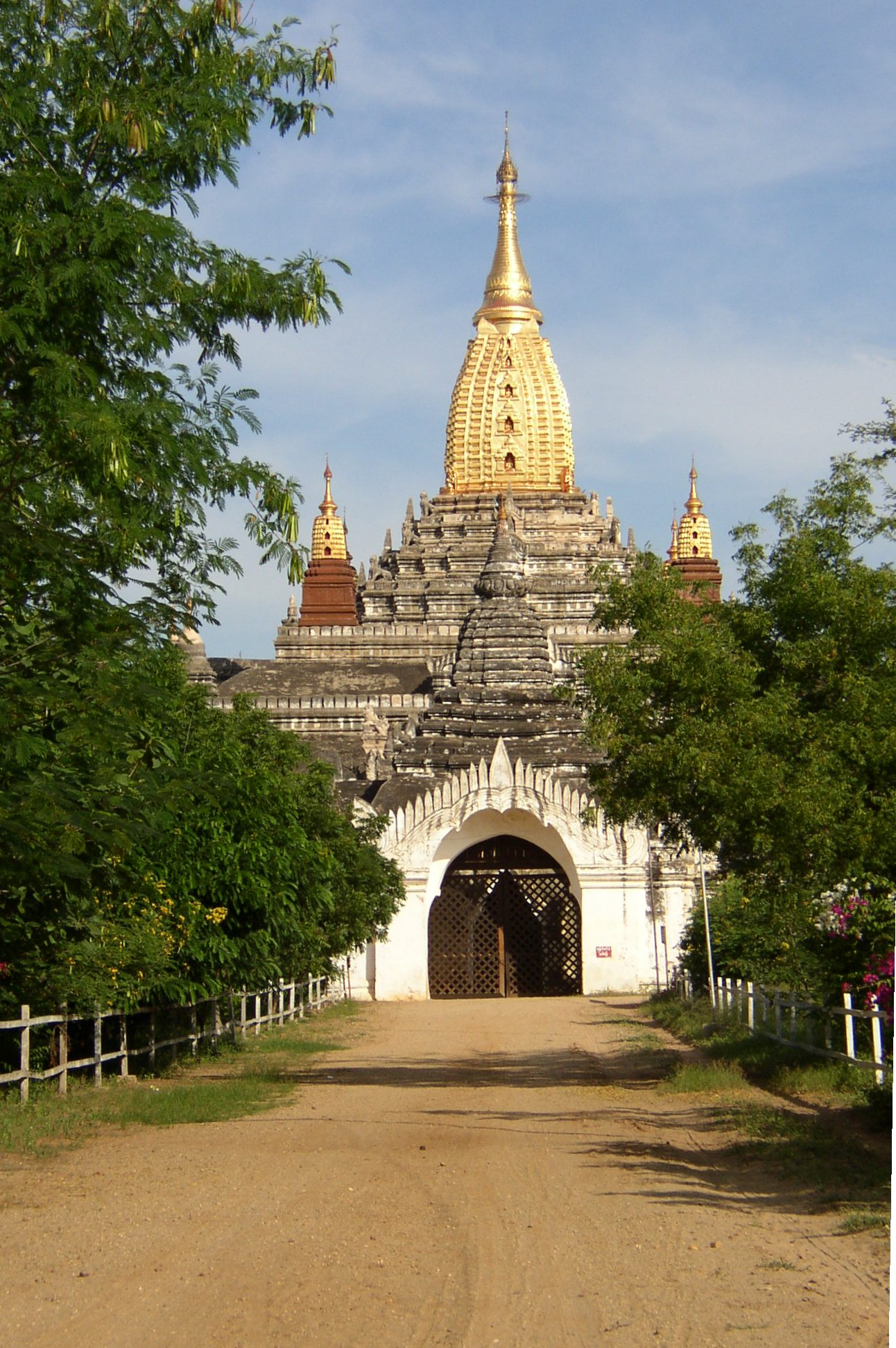
Ananda Temple, Bagan (1091)

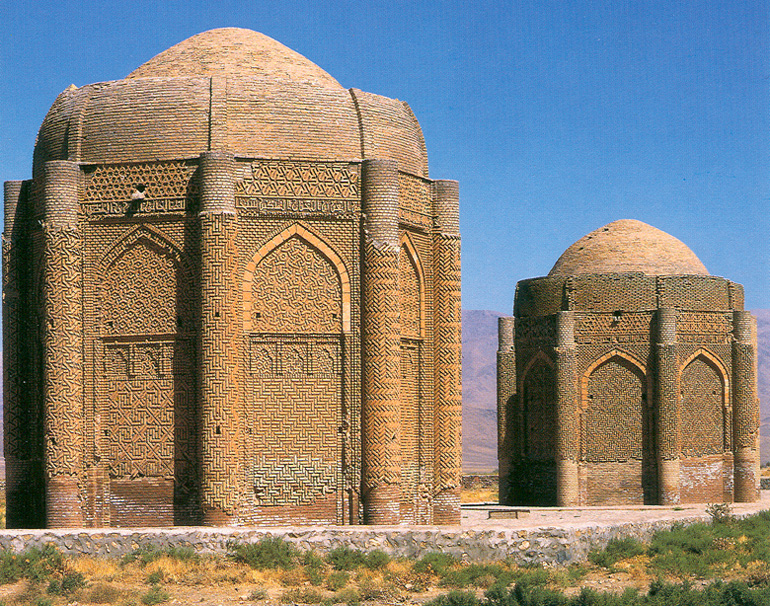
Kharaghan Towers (mausoleums) of Qazvin (1093)

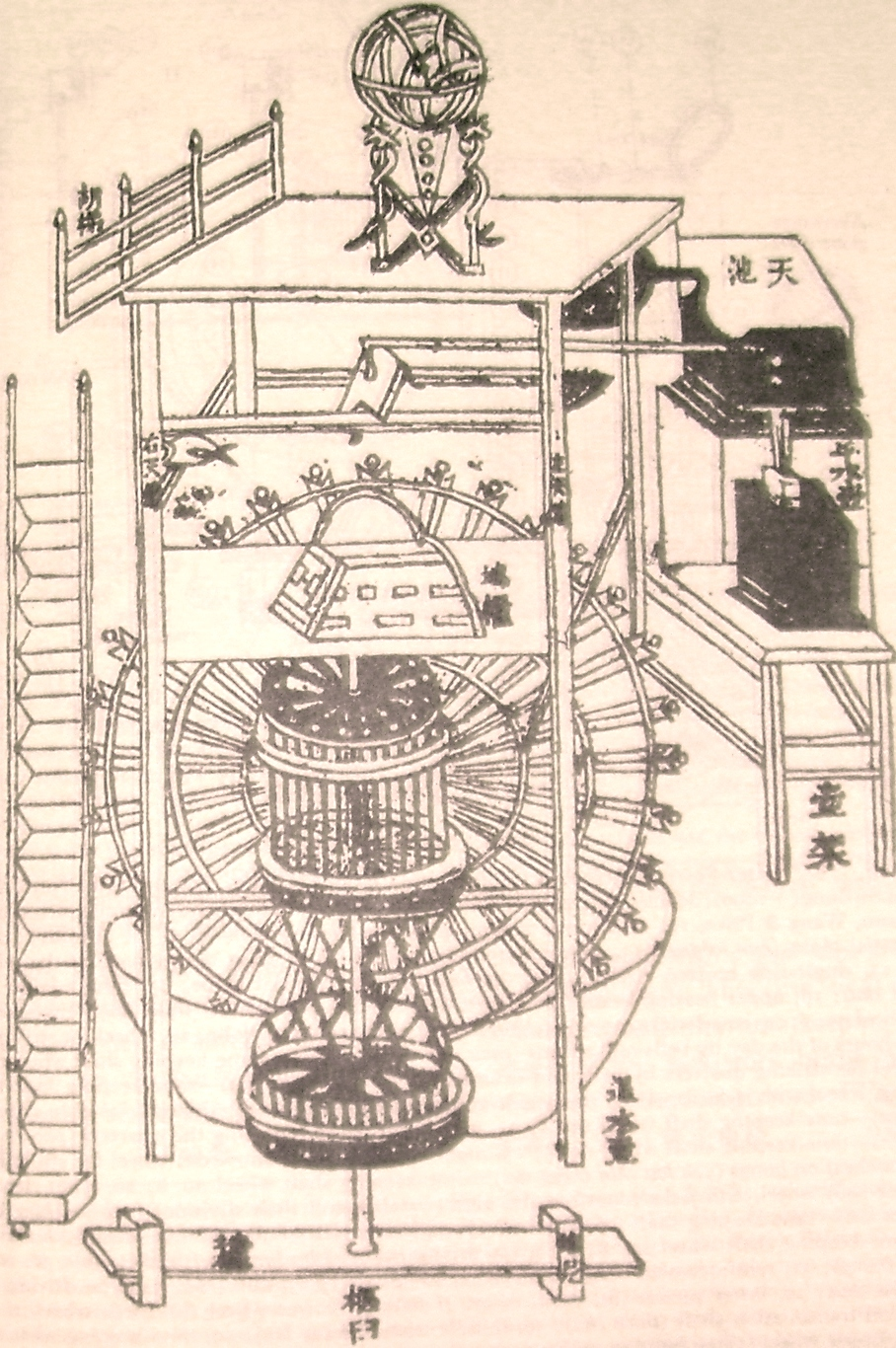
Su Song's astronomical clocktower in Bianjing (1094)

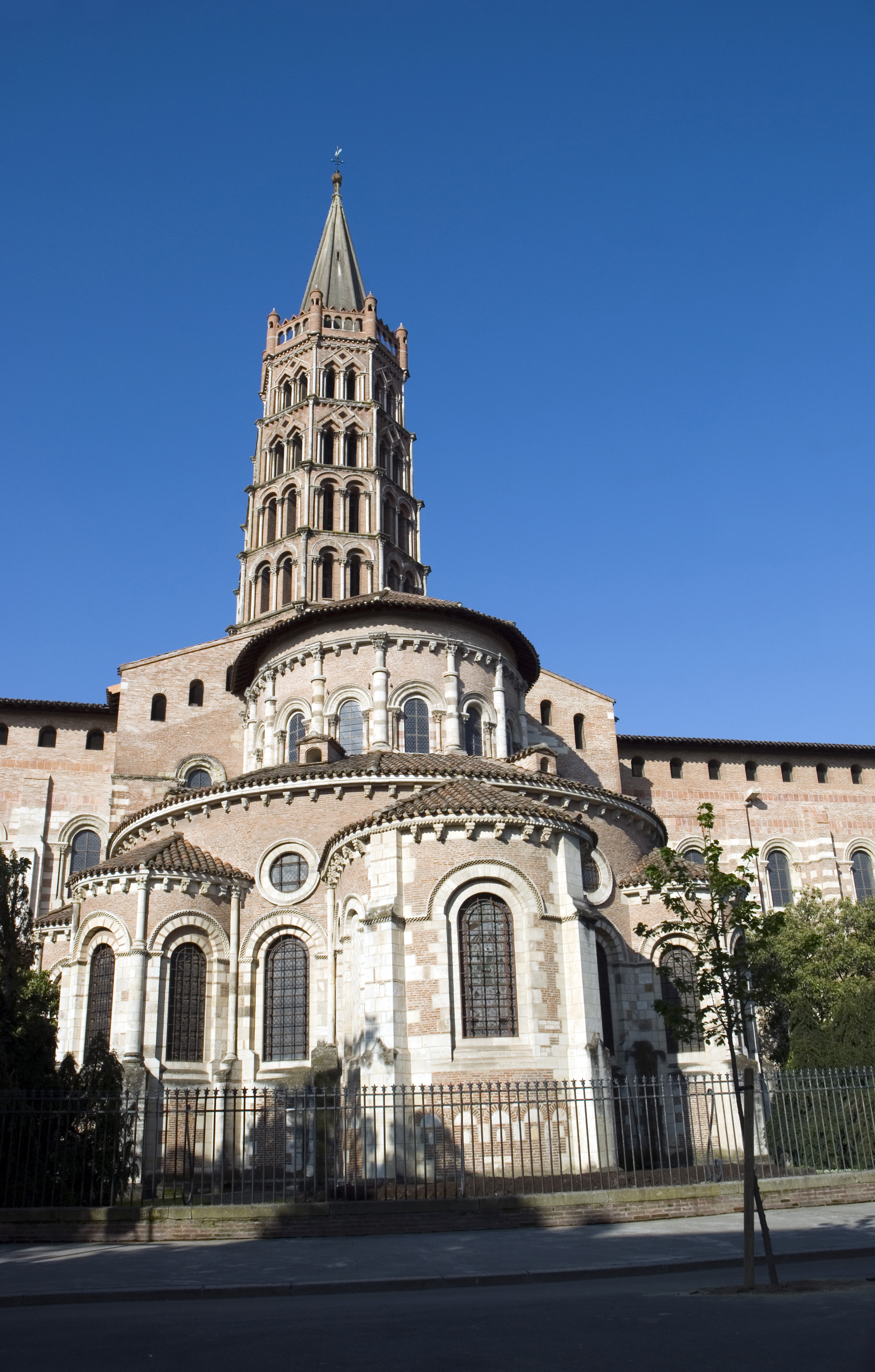
Chevet of St. Sernin's Basilica, Toulouse (1095)

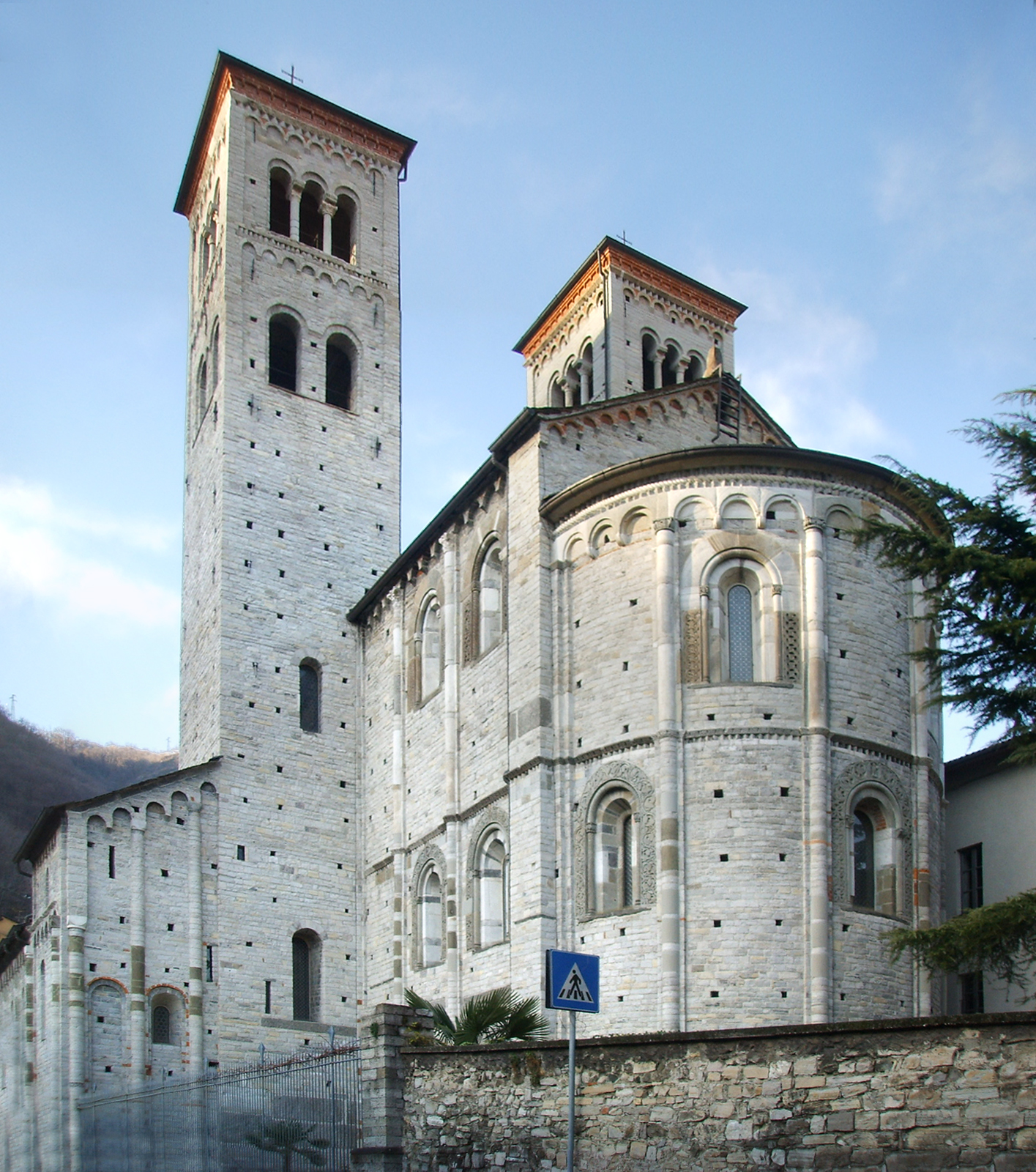
Basilica of Sant'Abbondio (1095)

Flower Pagoda in the Temple of the Six Banyan Trees, Guangzhou (1097)

== Births ==
- c. 1081 - Abbot Suger (died 1151), French abbot-statesman and patron of Gothic architecture.

== Deaths ==
- 1020 - Trdat the Architect (born c. 940s), Armenian
