= Grunhutte =

Coordinates: 47°47′38.2″N 7°27′39.1″E

- Interactive map of Grunhutte
- Country: France
- Department: Haut-Rhin
- Commune: Ottmarsheim

Grunhutte (French pronunciation: [ɡʁynyt]) is a hamlet within the commune of Ottmarsheim, Haut-Rhin, in eastern France.
