= Ottmarsheim =

Commune in Grand Est, France

- Commune
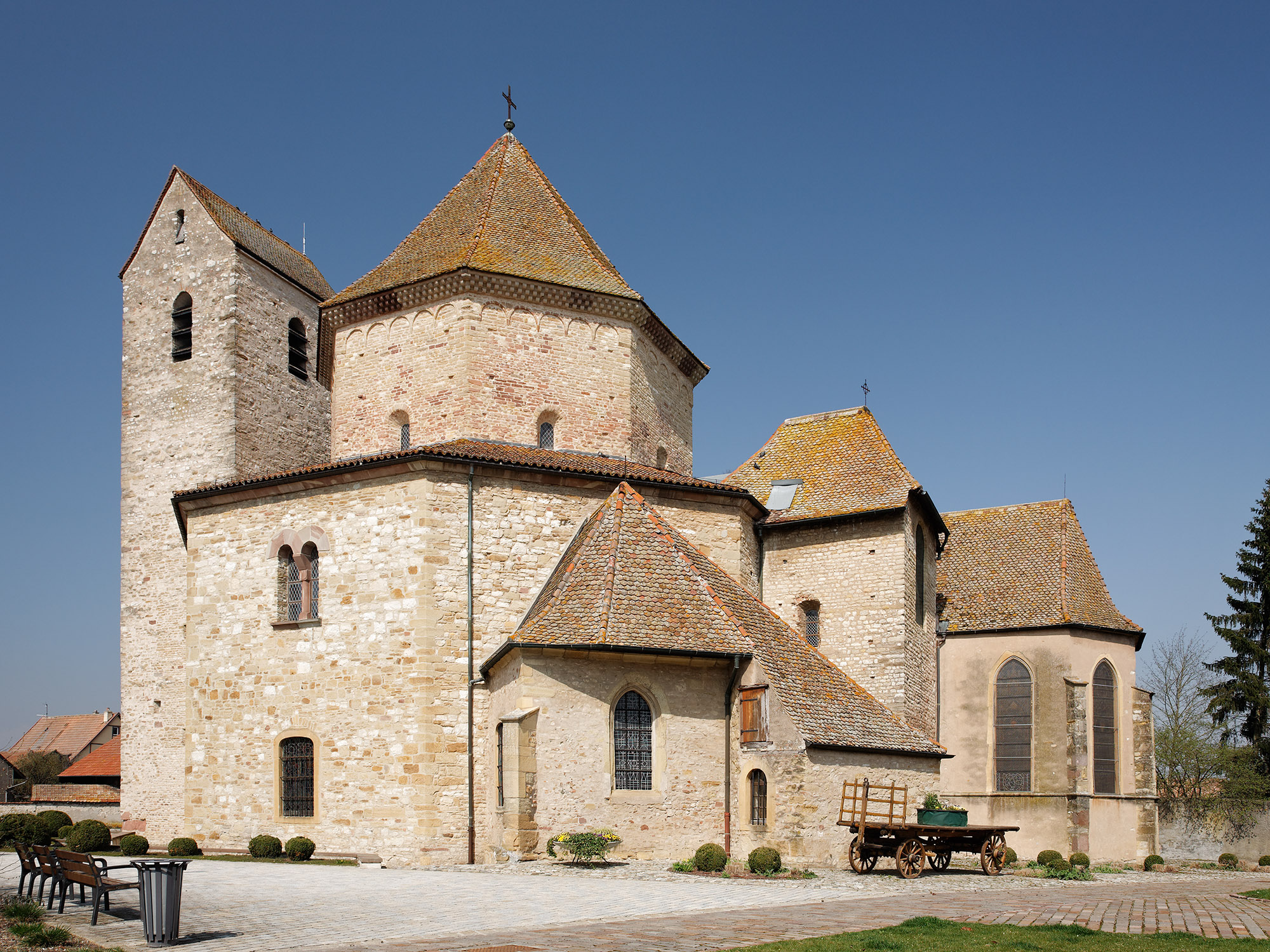
- Abbey church

- Coat of arms
- Location of Ottmarsheim
- Location within France Location within Grand Est
- Coordinates: 47°47′N 7°31′E
- Country: France
- Region: Grand Est
- Department: Haut-Rhin
- Arrondissement: Mulhouse
- Canton: Rixheim
- Intercommunality: CA Mulhouse Alsace Agglomération

Government
  - Mayor (2020–2026): Jean-Marie Behe
- Area^{1}: 25.67 km^{2} (9.91 sq mi)
- Elevation: 220 m (720 ft)
- Highest elevation: 235 m (771 ft)
- Lowest elevation: 217 m (712 ft)
- Population (2023): 2,054
  - Density: 80.02/km^{2} (207.2/sq mi)
- Time zone: UTC+01:00 (CET)
  - Summer (DST): UTC+02:00 (CEST)
- INSEE/Postal code: 68253 /68490
- ^{1} French Land Register data, which excludes lakes, ponds, glaciers > 1 km^{2} (0.386 sq mi or 247 acres) and river estuaries.

Ottmarsheim (French pronunciation: [ɔtmaʁsaim]; Alsatian: Ottmersche) is a commune in the Haut-Rhin department in Alsace in north-eastern France. It lies on the river Rhine and on the A36 autoroute, 14 km east of Mulhouse. Its octagonal parish church was the church of the former Benedictine abbey of Saint Mary, and dates from the early 11th century.

== Population ==
Historical population
Year	Pop.	±% p.a.
1968	1,766	—
1975	1,833	+0.53%
1982	2,003	+1.28%
1990	1,897	−0.68%
1999	1,926	+0.17%
2007	1,894	−0.21%
2012	1,829	−0.70%
2017	1,885	+0.60%
2023	2,054	+1.44%
Source: INSEE

== Populated places ==
- Grunhutte

== See also ==
- Communes of the Haut-Rhin department
- Ottonian architecture
