= Battle of Emmendingen =

1796 Battle of the War of the First Coalition

- Part of the War of the First Coalition
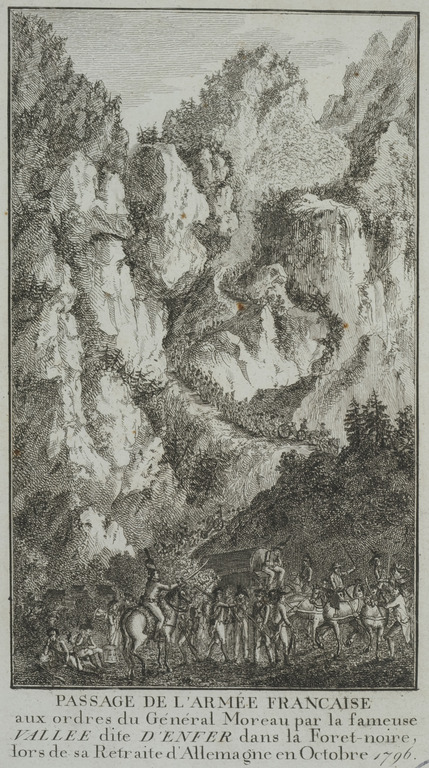
- Moreau's troops withdraw through the Val d'Enfer (Valley of Hell)
Date	19 October 1796
Location	Emmendingen (now southern Germany)
Result	Austrian victory

Belligerents
Republican France	Habsburg Austria

Commanders and leaders
Jean Moreau; Michel de Beaupuy †	Archduke Charles; Wilhelm von Wartensleben †

Strength
32,000 available Unknown number engaged	28,000 available approx. 10,000 engaged

Casualties and losses
1,000 killed and wounded approx. 1,800 captured 2 artillery pieces	1,000 killed or wounded

At the Battle of Emmendingen, on 19 October 1796, the French Army of Rhin-et-Moselle under Jean Victor Marie Moreau fought the First Coalition Army of the Upper Rhine commanded by Archduke Charles, Duke of Teschen. Emmendingen is located on the Elz River in Baden-Württemberg, Germany, 9 miles (14 km) north of Freiburg im Breisgau. The action occurred during the War of the First Coalition, the first phase of the larger French Revolutionary Wars.

After a summer of parrying between the two sides, the French were already withdrawing through the Black Forest to the Rhine. In close pursuit, the Austrians forced the French commander to split his force so he could cross the Rhine at three points via the bridges at Kehl, Breisach, and Hüningen. By mid-September, though, the Austrians controlled the approaches to the crossings at Breisach and Kehl. Moreau still wanted half his army to approach the Austrians at Kehl. The rugged terrain at Emmendingen complicated fighting, making it possible for the Habsburg force to snipe at the French troops, and to block any passage toward Kehl; rainy and cold weather further hampered the efforts of both sides, turning streams and rivulets into rushing torrents of water, and making roadways slippery. The fighting was fierce; two generals died in the battle, one from each side.

Habsburg success at Emmendingen forced the French to abandon their plans for a three-pronged, or even a two-pronged, withdrawal. The French continued their retreat through the Black Forest mountain towns to the south, where the armies fought the Battle of Schliengen five days later.

== Background ==
Initially, the rulers of Europe viewed the French Revolution as a dispute between the French king and his subjects, and not something in which they should interfere. As revolutionary rhetoric grew more strident, they declared the interest of the monarchs of Europe as one with the interests of Louis XVI and his family; this Declaration of Pillnitz (27 August 1791) threatened ambiguous, but quite serious, consequences if anything should happen to the royal family. The position of the revolutionaries became increasingly difficult. Compounding their problems in international relations, French émigrés continued to agitate for support of a counter-revolution. Finally, on 20 April 1792, the French National Convention declared war on Austria. In this War of the First Coalition (1792–1798), France ranged itself against most of the European states sharing land or water borders with her, plus Portugal and the Ottoman Empire. Despite some victories in 1792, by early 1793, France was in crisis: French forces had been pushed out of Belgium, the French king had just been executed, and there was revolt in the Vendée over conscription and widespread resentment of the Civil Constitution of the Clergy. The armies of the French Republic were in a state of disruption; the problems became even more acute following the introduction of mass conscription, the levée en masse, which saturated an already distressed army with thousands of illiterate, untrained men. For the French, the Rhine Campaign of 1795 proved especially disastrous, although they had achieved some success in other theaters of war, including the War of the Pyrenees (1793–1795).

The armies of the First Coalition included the imperial contingents and the infantry and cavalry of the various states, amounting to about 125,000 (including three autonomous corps), a sizable force by eighteenth century standards but a moderate force by the standards of the Revolutionary and Napoleonic wars. In total, the commander-in-chief Archduke Charles' troops stretched from Switzerland to the North Sea and Dagobert Sigmund von Wurmser's, from the Swiss-Italian border to the Adriatic. Habsburg troops made up the bulk of the army, but the "thin white line" of Coalition infantry could not cover the territory from Basel to Frankfurt with sufficient depth to resist the pressure of their opponents. (Note: Habsburg infantry wore white coats.) Compared to French coverage, Charles had half the number of troops to cover a 340-kilometer (340,000 m) front that stretched from Renchen near Basel to Bingen. Furthermore, he had concentrated the bulk of his force, commanded by Count Baillet Latour, between Karlsruhe and Darmstadt, where the confluence of the Rhine and the Main made an attack most likely; the rivers offered a gateway into eastern German states and ultimately to Vienna, with good bridges crossing a relatively well-defined river bank. To his north, Wilhelm von Wartensleben's autonomous corps (Note: An autonomous corps, in the Austrian or Imperial armies, was an armed force under command of an experienced field commander. They usually included two divisions, but probably not more than three, and functioned with high maneuverability and were able to undertake independent action, hence the name "autonomous corps." Some, called the Frei-Corps, or independent corps, were used as light infantry before the official formation of light infantry in the Habsburg Army in 1798. They provided the Army's skirmishing and scouting function; Frei-Corps were usually raised from the provinces. Military historians usually maintain that Napoleon solidified the use of the autonomous corps, armies that could function without a great deal of direction, scatter about the countryside, but reform again quickly for battle; this was actually a development that first emerged first in the French and Indian War in the Thirteen British Colonies and later in the American Revolutionary War, and became widely used in the European military as the size of armies grew in the 1790s and during the Napoleonic Wars.) covered the line between Mainz and Giessen. The Austrian army consisted of professionals, many brought from the border regions in the Balkans, and conscripts drafted from the Imperial Circles. (Note: Beginning in the sixteenth century, the Holy Roman Empire was organized loosely into ten "circles", or regional groups of ecclesiastical, dynastic, and secular polities that coordinated economic, military and political actions. During times of war, the Circles contributed troops to the Imperial Army, which was composed predominantly of the Habsburg military, by drafting (or soliciting volunteers) among their inhabitants. Some Circles coordinated their efforts better than others; the Swabian Circle was among the more effective of the imperial circles at organizing itself and protecting its economic interests.)

=== Resumption of fighting: 1796 ===
In January 1796, the French and the members of the First Coalition called a truce, ending the Rhine Campaign of 1795; they understood it was temporary. This agreement lasted until 20 May 1796, when the Austrians announced that it would end on 31 May. The Coalition's Army of the Lower Rhine included 90,000 troops, mostly Habsburg and Reichsarmee (Imperial) troops mustered from the states of the Holy Roman Empire. The 20,000-man right wing under Duke Ferdinand Frederick Augustus of Württemberg stood on the east bank of the Rhine behind the Sieg River, observing the French bridgehead at Düsseldorf. The garrisons of Mainz Fortress and Ehrenbreitstein Fortress counted 10,000 more. Charles posted the remainder of the Habsburg and Coalition force on the west bank behind the Nahe. (Note: The First Coalition included the Habsburg Archduchy of Austria, the Holy Roman Empire, Kingdom of Prussia, Kingdom of Spain and the Dutch Republic until 1795, Sardinia until 1796, Kingdom of Sicily and several other Italian states (at various times and duration), Kingdom of Portugal, French royalists (mostly those in the Prince Conde's emigre army) and Great Britain.) Dagobert Sigmund von Wurmser led the 80,000-strong Army of the Upper Rhine. Its right wing occupied Kaiserslautern on the west bank, and the left wing under Anton Sztáray, Michael von Fröhlich and Louis Joseph, Prince of Condé guarded the Rhine from Mannheim to Switzerland. The original Coalition strategy was to capture Trier and to use the position on the west bank to strike at each of the French armies in turn. However, news arrived in Vienna of Bonaparte's successes. Reconsidering the situation, the Aulic Council gave Archduke Charles command over both Austrian armies and ordered him to hold his ground and sent Wurmser to Italy with 25,000 reinforcements. The loss of Wurmser and his troops weakened the Coalition force considerably.

On the French side, the 80,000-man Army of Sambre-et-Meuse held the west bank of the Rhine down to the Nahe and then southwest to Sankt Wendel. On the army's left flank, Jean-Baptiste Kléber had 22,000 troops in an entrenched camp at Düsseldorf. The right wing of the Army of Rhin-et-Moselle was positioned behind the Rhine from Hüningen northward, its center was along the Queich River near Landau and its left wing extended west toward Saarbrücken. Pierre Marie Barthélemy Ferino led Moreau's right wing, Louis Desaix commanded the center and Laurent Gouvion Saint-Cyr directed the left wing. Ferino's wing consisted of three infantry and cavalry divisions under François Antoine Louis Bourcier and Henri François Delaborde. Desaix's command counted three divisions led by Michel de Beaupuy, Antoine Guillaume Delmas and Charles Antoine Xaintrailles. Saint-Cyr's wing had two divisions commanded by Guillaume Philibert Duhesme, and Taponier.

The French grand plan called for two French armies to press against the flanks of the northern armies in the German states while simultaneously a third army approached Vienna through Italy. Jourdan's army would push southeast from Düsseldorf, intending to draw troops and attention toward themselves, which would allow Moreau's army an easier crossing of the Rhine between Kehl and Hüningen. According to plan, Jourdan's army feinted toward Mannheim, and Charles quickly reapportioned his troops. Moreau's army attacked the bridgehead at Kehl, which was guarded by 7,000 imperial troops—troops recruited that spring from the Swabian circle polities, inexperienced and untrained—which amazingly held the bridgehead for several hours, but then retreated toward Rastatt. On June 23–24, Moreau reinforced the bridgehead with his forward guard. After pushing the imperial militia from their post on the bridgehead, his troops poured into Baden unhindered. Similarly, in the south, by Basel, Ferino's column moved speedily across the river and proceeded up the Rhine along the Swiss and German shoreline, toward Lake Constance and into the southern end of the Black Forest. Anxious that his supply lines would be overextended, Charles began a retreat to the east.

At this point, the inherent jealousies and competition between generals came into play. Moreau could have joined up with Jourdan's army in the north, but did not; he proceeded eastward, pushing Charles into Bavaria. Jourdan also moved eastward, pushing Wartensleben's autonomous corps into the Ernestine duchies, and neither general seemed willing to unite his flank with his compatriot's. There followed a summer of strategic retreats, flanking, and reflanking maneuvers. On either side, the union of two armies—Wartensleben's with Charles' or Jourdan's with Moreau's—could have crushed the opposition. Wartensleben and Charles united first, and the tide turned against the French. With 25,000 of his best troops, the Archduke crossed to the north bank of the Danube at Regensburg and moved north to join his colleague Wartensleben. The defeat of Jourdan's army at the battles of Amberg, Würzburg and Altenkirchen allowed Charles to move more troops to the south. The next contact occurred on 19 October at Emmendingen.

== Terrain ==
Emmendingen lies in the Elz valley, which winds through the Black Forest. The Elz creates a series of hanging valleys which challenge the passage of large bodies of troops; the rainy weather further complicated the passage through the Elz valley. The area around Riegel am Kaiserstuhl is noted for its loess and narrow transition points, which greatly influenced the battle.

Terrain in images
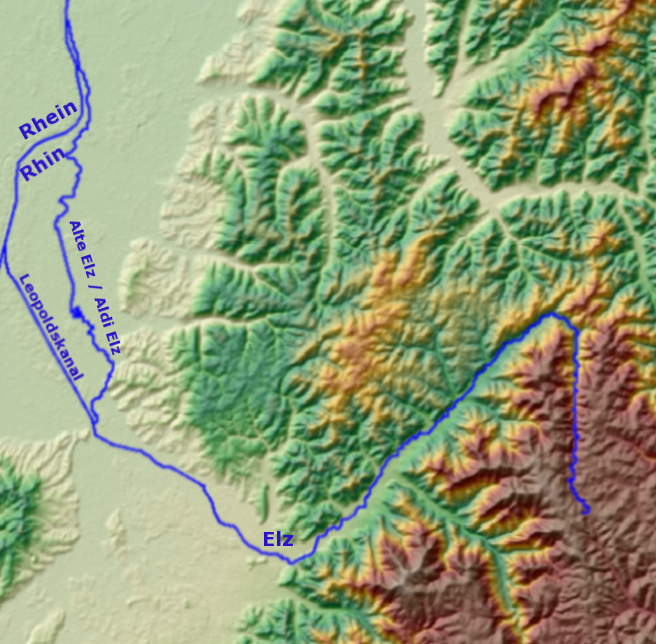
The Elz drops from the heights of the Black Forest to join the Rhine.

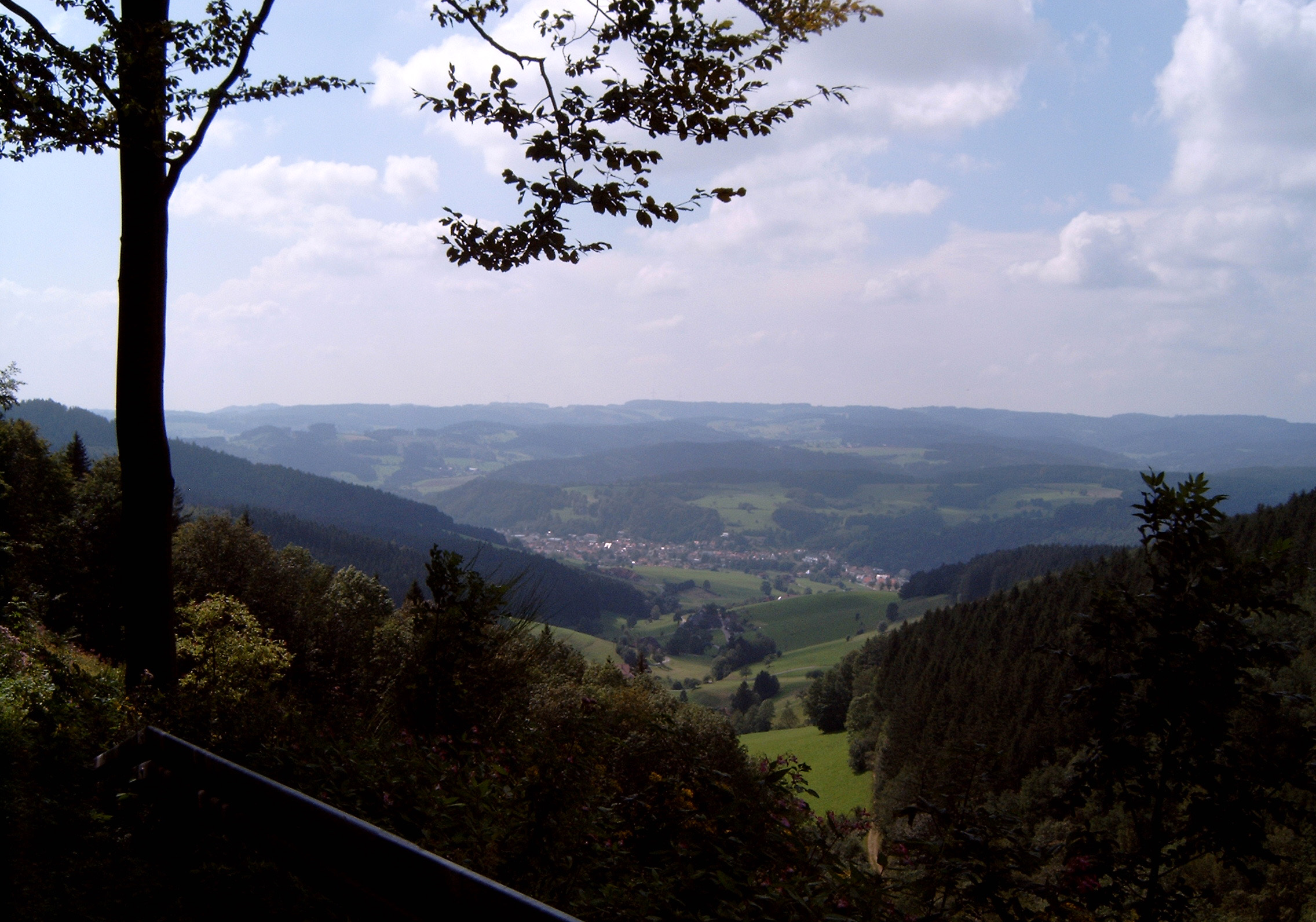
Overlooking Elzbach, the mountains offered clear advantage to soldiers in the higher ground.

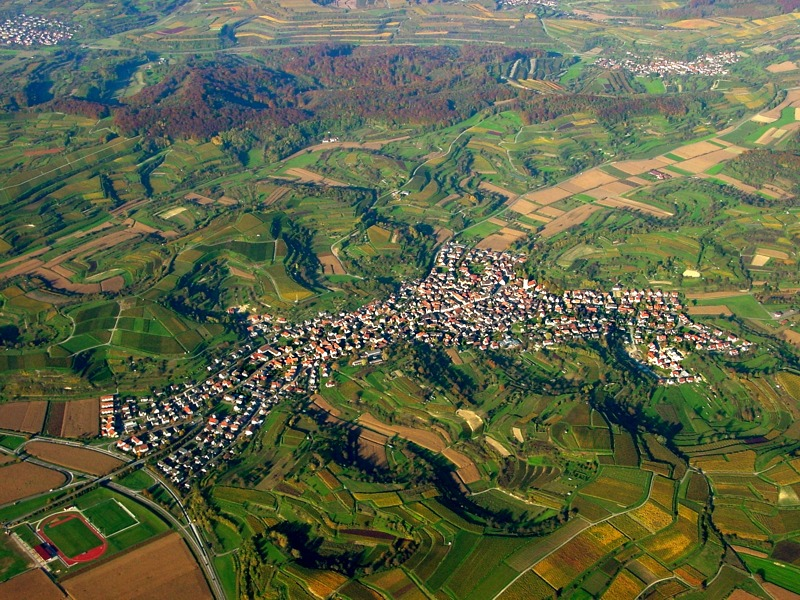
Aerial panorama of Malterdingen illustrates the hilly and forested terrain surrounding the village.

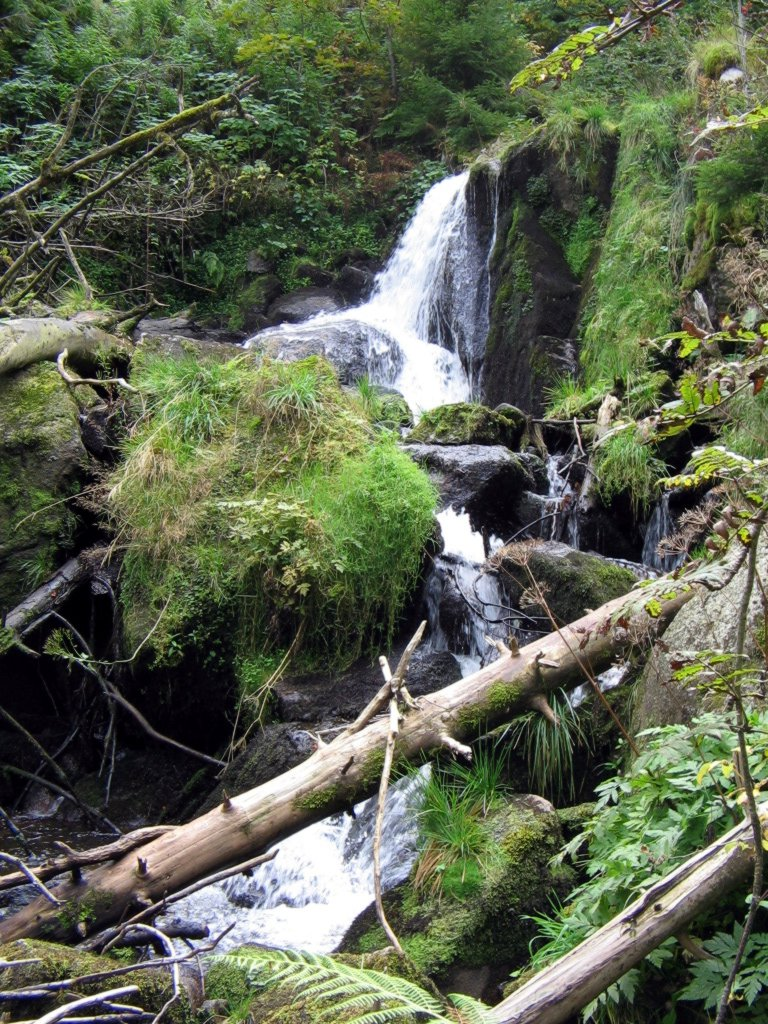
Rocky outcroppings, hanging valleys, and overflowing streams complicated passage through the rough terrain.

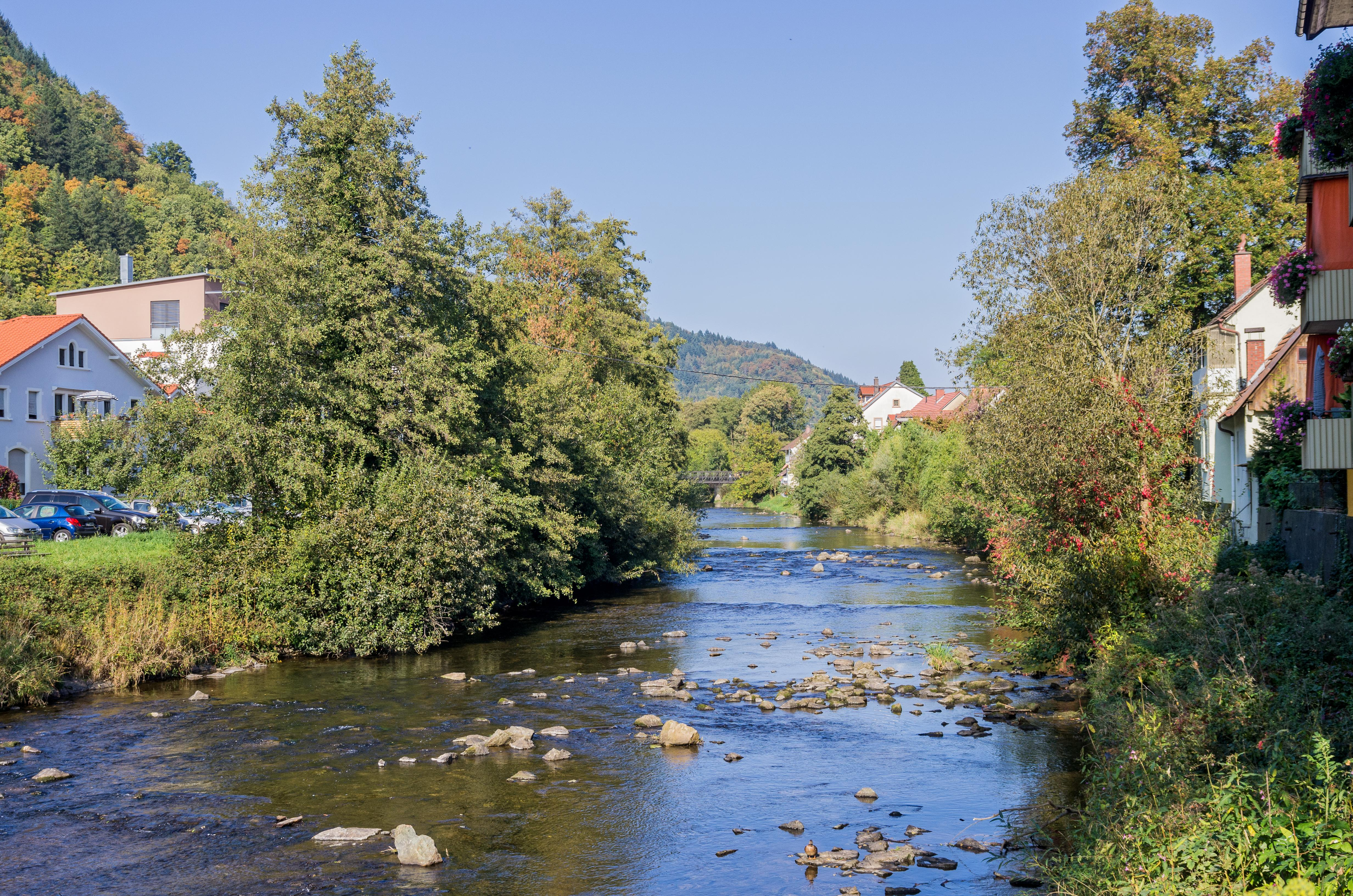
Heavy rains turned the Elz from a trickling stream to a rushing torrent at flood stage by 19 October.

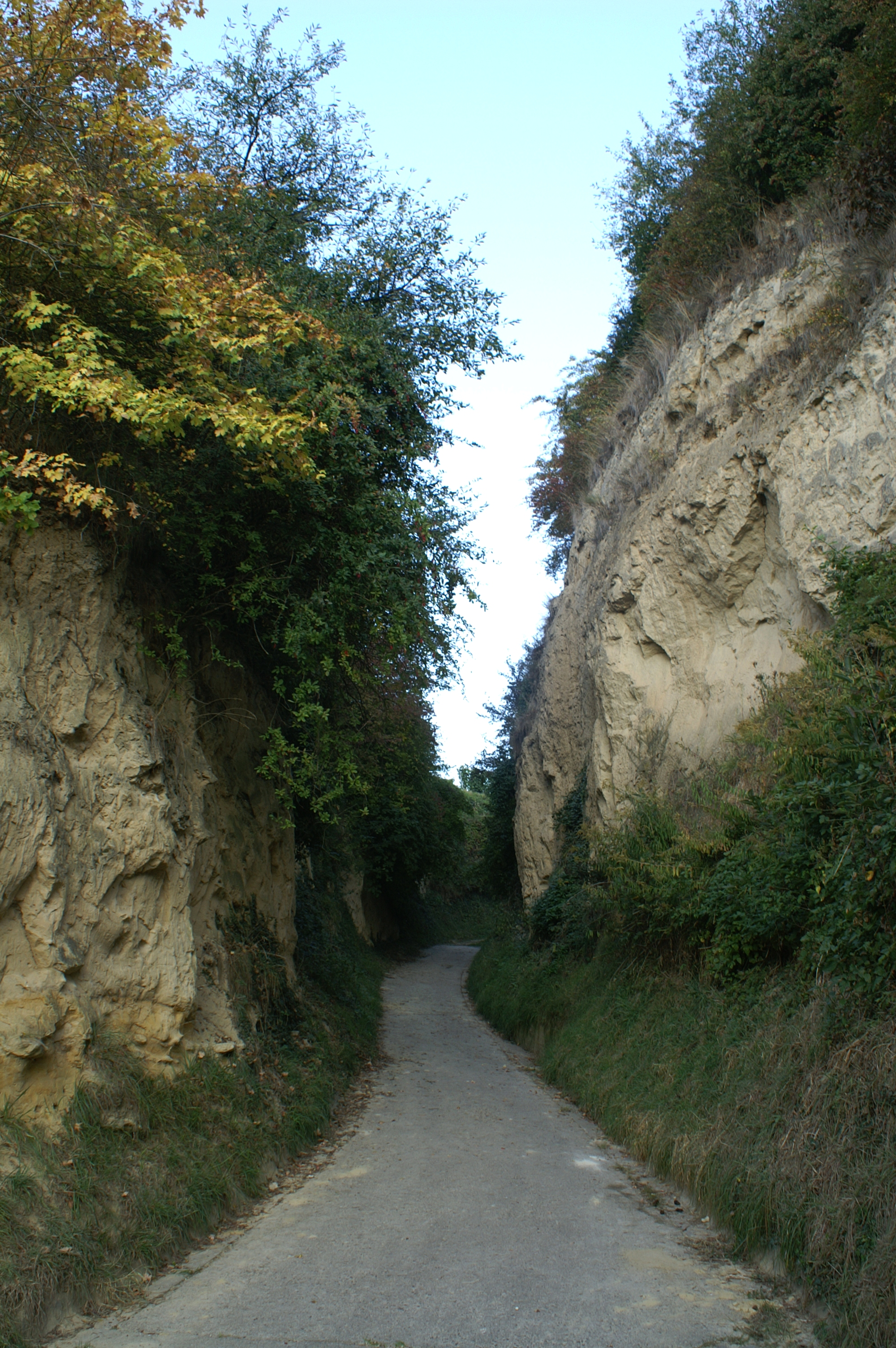
The loess created alleys through which soldiers had to march, and which made them vulnerable to attacks from above.

== Dispositions ==
The better part of the French army debouched through the Höll valley. Desaix's left wing included the nine battalions and 12 squadrons of the Division St. Suzanne by Riegel, straddling both shores of the Elz. To the right, between Malterdingen and Emmendingen, Beaupuy commanded a division of 12 battalions and 12 squadrons. Further to the right, by Emmendingen itself, and in the heights by Heimbach, stood Saint-Cyr; around this stretched the Duhesme's Division (12 battalions and eight squadrons). Further to the right of these, in the Elz valley by Waldkirch stood Ambert's division and the Girard brigade; by Zähringen, about a mile away, Lecourbe's brigade stood in reserve, and, stretching northward from there, a mounted division of 14,000 roamed the vicinity of Holzhausen (nowadays part of March, Breisgau). These positions created a line about 3 mi (5 km) long. On the far side of Lecorbe's brigade stood Ferino's 15 battalions and 16 squadrons, but these were well to the south and east of Freiburg im Breisgau, still tramping through the mountains. Everyone had been hampered by heavy rains; the ground was soft and slippery, and both the Rhine and Elz rivers had flooded, as had the many tributaries. This increased the hazards of mounted attack, because the horses could not get a good footing.

Against this stood the Archduke's force. Upon reaching a few miles of Emmendingen, the Archduke split his force into four columns. Column Nauendorf, in the upper Elz, had eight battalions and 14 squadrons, advancing southwest to Waldkirch; Wartensleben had 12 battalions and 23 squadrons advancing south to capture the Elz bridge at Emmendingen. Latour, with 6,000 men, was to cross the foothills via Heimbach and Malterdingen, and capture the bridge of Köndringen, between Riegel and Emmendingen, and column Fürstenberg held Kinzingen, about 2 mi (3.2 km) north of Riegel. Frölich and Condé (part of Nauendorf's column) were instructed to pin down Ferino and the French right wing in the Stieg valley.

== Battle ==
The first to arrive at Emmindingen, the French secured the high point at Waldkirch, which commanded the neighboring valleys; it was considered, at the time, a maxim of military tactics, that command of the mountains gave control of the valleys. By 19 October, the armies faced each other, on the banks of the Elz from Waldkirch to Emmendingen. By then, Moreau knew he could not proceed to Kehl along the right bank of the Rhine, so he decided to cross the Rhine further north, at Breisach. The bridge there was small, though, and his whole army could not pass over without causing a bottleneck, so he sent only the left wing, commanded by Desaix, to cross there.

At dawn, Saint-Cyr (French right) advanced along the Elz valley. Nauendorf prepared to move his Habsburg forces down the valley. Seeing this, Saint-Cyr sent a small column across the mountains to the east of the main valley, to the village of Simonswald, located in a side valley. He instructed them to attack Nauendorf's left, and to force him to withdraw from Bleibach. Anticipating this, though, Nauendorf had already posted units on the heights along the Elz valley, from which Austrian shooters ambushed Saint-Cyr's men. On the other side of the Elz valley, more Habsburg gunmen reached Kollnau, which overlooked Waldkirch, and from there they could fire down on the French force. The fighting was swift and furious. The superior Austrian positions forced Saint-Cyr to cancel his advance on Bleibach and withdraw to Waldkirch; even there, though, Nauendorf's men continued to harass him, and Saint-Cyr retreated another 2 mi (3 km) to the relative safety of Denzlingen.

The fighting went no better for the French on their left. Decaen's advanced guard proceeded forward, albeit cautiously. Austrian marksmen fired down upon the column, and Decaen fell from his horse, injured. Beaupuy took Decaen's place with the advance guard. At midday, Latour abandoned his customary caution and sent two columns to attack Beaupuy between Malterdingen and Höllental (Val d'Enfer), resulting in a fierce firefight. After giving an order to retreat along the Elz, Beaupuy was killed and his division did not receive an order to retreat, causing additional losses for the French.

In the center, French riflemen posted in the Landeck wood, 2 mi (3 km) north of Emmendingen, held up two of Wartensleben's detachments while his third struggled over muddy, nearly impassable, roads. Wartensleben's men needed all day to fight their way to Emmendingen, and during the shooting, Wartensleben's left arm was shattered by a musket ball. Finally, late in the day, Wartensleben's third column arrived and threatened to outflank the French right; the French retreated across the Elz river, destroying the bridges behind them.

At the close of the day's fighting, Moreau's force stood in a precarious position. Left to right, the French were stretched along a jagged, broken line of about 8 mi (13 km). Decaen's division stood at Riegel and Endingen, at the north-eastern corner of the Kaiserstuhl, no longer of any assistance to the bulk of Moreau's force; Moreau had also lost an energetic and promising officer in Beaupuy. On the right, Saint-Cyr's division stood behind Denzlingen, and the left stretched to Unterreute, a thin line also separated from the center, at Nimburg (near Tenningen and Landeck), halfway between Riegel and Unterreute. The French line faced north-east towards the Austrians; despite Habsburg successes throughout the day, the Coalition forces were unable to flank the French line, and the French consequently were able to withdraw in reasonably good order to the south.

== Aftermath ==
Both sides lost a general: Wartensleben was shot with a musket ball and died of his wounds (eighteen months later in Vienna) and General of Division Michel de Beaupuy was hit by a cannonball and died immediately. Out of approximately 32,000 troops who could have participated, the French lost 1,000 killed and wounded, and close to 1,800 captured, plus the loss of two artillery pieces. The Austrians sent 10,000 out of 28,000 troops available (36%), and lost about 1,000 killed, wounded or missing (10%). Smith estimates the French troop count based on united count of Ferino and Moreau at the Battle of Schliengen, four days later.

The only way to reacquire the crossing at Kehl, Moreau needed to send a sizeable force against Franz Petrasch, who had held the approaches since September, and this force was no longer available after Emmendingen. By controlling the eastern access to the Kehl/Strasbourg crossing, Petrasch forced Moreau to march south; any retreat into France would have to occur via the bridges at Hüningen, a longer march, not at Kehl and Strasbourg.

The lack of bridges did not slow the Coalition's pursuit. The Coalition forces repaired the bridges by Malterdingen, and moved on Moreau at Freiburg im Breisgau within 24 hours. On 20 October, Moreau's army of 20,000 united south of Freiburg with Ferino's column. Ferino's force was smaller than Moreau had hoped, bringing the total of the combined French force to about 32,000. Charles' combined forces of 24,000 closely followed Moreau's rear guard from Freiburg, southwest, to a line of hills stretching between Kandern and the Rhine. Skirting the mountain towns, Moreau next engaged the Archduke at the Battle of Schliengen. (Note: Smith does not fully explain the difference of 4,000 men in the Coalition force, although he is clear on there being 28,000 available at Emmendingen and 24,000 available at Schliengen; the difference in injuries does not account for the difference in numbers.)

== Notes, citations and alphabetical listing of resources ==
=== Alphabetical listing of resources ===
- Alison, Archibald (Sir Archibald Alison, 1st Baron). History of Europe. London: W. Blackwood and Sons, 1835. ISBN 978-0243088355
- Blanning, Timothy. The French Revolutionary Wars. New York: Oxford University Press, 1996, ISBN 0-340-56911-5
- (in German) Charles, Archduke of Austria. Ausgewählte Schriften weiland seiner kaiserlichen Hoheit des Erzherzogs Carl von Österreich. Vienna, W. Braumüller, 1893–94. OCLC 12847108.
- Dodge, Theodore Ayrault. Warfare in the Age of Napoleon: The Revolutionary Wars Against the First Coalition in Northern Europe and the Italian Campaign, 1789–1797. Leonaur, 2011. ISBN 978-0857065988.
- Dupuy, Roger. La période jacobine: terreur, guerre et gouvernement révolutionnaire: 1792–1794, Paris, Seuil, 2005. ISBN 978-2-02-039818-3
- (in German) Ersch, Johann Samuel. Allgemeine encyclopädie der wissenschaften und künste in alphabetischer folge von genannten schrifts bearbeitet und herausgegeben. Leipzig, J. F. Gleditsch, 1889. OCLC 560539774
- Gates, David. The Napoleonic Wars 1803–1815, New York, Random House, 2011. ISBN 978-0712607193
- Graham, Thomas, Baron Lynedoch. The History of the Campaign of 1796 in Germany and Italy. London, 1797. OCLC 277280926.
- Haythornthwaite, Philip. Austrian Army of the Napoleonic Wars (1): Infantry. Osprey Publishing, 2012. ISBN 978-1782007029
- (in French) Huot, Paul. Des Vosges au Rhin, excursions et causeries alsaciennes, Veuve Berger-Levrault & Fils, Paris, 1868. OCLC 918794374
- Phipps, Ramsay Weston. The Armies of the First French Republic: Volume II The Armées du Moselle, du Rhin, de Sambre-et-Meuse, de Rhin-et-Moselle. US: Pickle Partners Publishing 2011 reprint of original publication 1920–32. ISBN 978-1908692252
- Rickard, J. Battle of Emmendingen, History of War. 17 February 2009. Accessed 18 November 2014.
- Rothenburg, Gunther. "The Habsburg Army in the Napoleonic Wars (1792–1815)". Military Affairs, 37:1 (Feb 1973), pp. 1–5.
- Schroeder, Paul W. Transformation of Europe, 1763–1848, Clarendon, 1996, chapters 2–3. ISBN 978-0198206545
- Smith, Digby. Napoleonic Wars Data Book. Mechanicsburg, PA: Stackpole, 1999. ISBN 978-1853672767
- (in German) Wurzbach, Constant von. Biographisches Lexikon des Kaisertums Österreich 53. Vienna, 1886. OCLC 246291768
- Vann, James Allen. The Swabian Kreis: Institutional Growth in the Holy Roman Empire 1648–1715. Vol. LII, Studies Presented to International Commission for the History of Representative and Parliamentary Institutions. Bruxelles, 1975.OCLC 923507312
- Walker, Mack. German Home Towns: Community, State, and General Estate, 1648–1871. Ithaca, 1998. OCLC 2276157

Preceded by Battle of Bassano	French Revolution: Revolutionary campaigns Battle of Emmendingen	Succeeded by Battle of Schliengen
