= Battle of Schliengen =

1796 War of the First Coalition battle

- Part of the War of the First Coalition
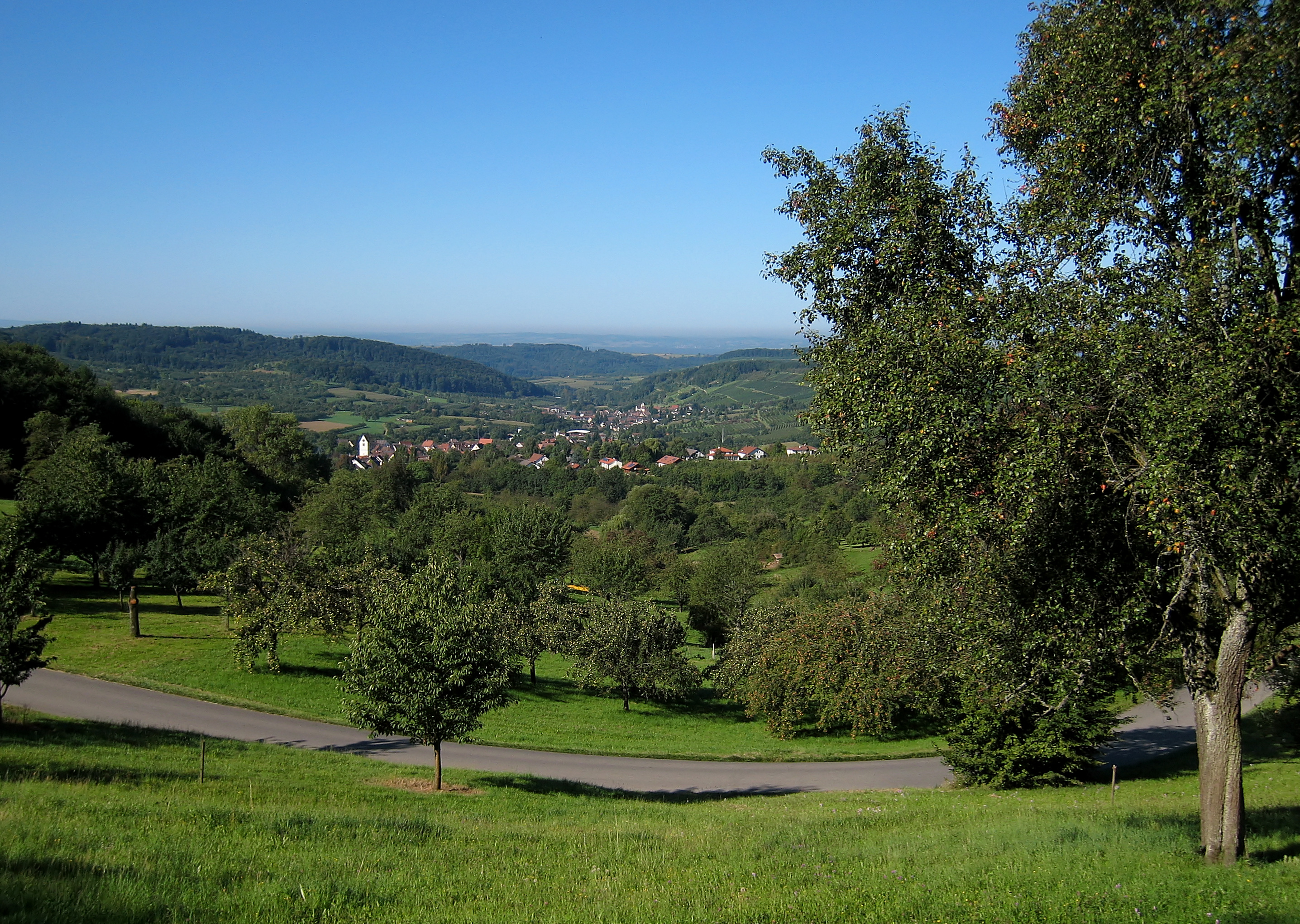
- Present-day view of the battlefield
Date	24 October 1796
Location	Schliengen, Lörrach, Baden 47°45′20″N 7°34′38″E
Result	Austrian victory

Belligerents
Austria	France

Commanders and leaders
Archduke Charles	Jean Moreau

Strength
24,000	32,000

Casualties and losses
800 killed and wounded	1,200 killed and wounded

The Battle of Schliengen took place on 24 October 1796 between the French Army of the Rhine and Moselle and the Austrian army near the village of Schliengen during the War of the First Coalition. The French army was under the command of Jean-Victor Moreau and the Austrian army was under the command of Archduke Charles of Austria. The village lies in the present-day Kreis Lörrach in Baden-Württemberg, Germany, close to the borders with Haut-Rhin (France), and the Canton of Basel-Stadt (Switzerland). During the French Revolutionary Wars, Schliengen was a strategically important location for the armies of both Republican France and Habsburg Austria. Control of the area gave either combatant access to southwestern German states and important Rhine crossings.

On 20 October Moreau retreated from Freiburg im Breisgau and established his army along a ridge of hills. The severe condition of the roads prevented Archduke Charles from flanking the French right wing. The French left wing lay too close to the Rhine to outflank, and the French center, positioned in a 7-mile (11 km) semi-circle on heights that commanded the terrain below, was unassailable. Instead, Charles attacked the French flanks directly, and in force, which increased casualties for both sides.

Although both the French and the Austrians claimed victory at the time, military historians generally agree that the Austrians achieved a strategic advantage. However, the French withdrew from the battlefield in good order and several days later crossed the Rhine River at Hüningen. A confusion of politics and diplomacy in Vienna wasted any strategic advantage that Charles might have obtained and locked the Habsburg force into two sieges on the Rhine, when the troops were badly needed in northern Italy. The battle is commemorated on a monument in Vienna and on the Arc de Triomphe in Paris.

== Background ==
Initially, the rulers of Europe viewed the French Revolution as a dispute between the French king and his subjects, and not something in which they should interfere. As revolutionary rhetoric grew more strident, they declared the interest of the monarchs of Europe as one with the interests of Louis XVI and his family; the Declaration of Pillnitz (27 August 1791) threatened ambiguous, but quite serious, consequences if anything should happen to the royal family. The position of the revolutionaries became increasingly difficult. Compounding their problems in international relations, French émigrés continued to agitate for support of a counter-revolution. Finally, on 20 April 1792, the French National Convention declared war on Austria. In this War of the First Coalition (1792–98), France ranged itself against most of the European states sharing land or water borders with her, plus Portugal and the Ottoman Empire. Despite some victories in 1792, by early 1793, France was in terrible crisis: French forces had been pushed out of Belgium; also there was revolt in the Vendée over conscription; wide-spread resentment of the Civil Constitution of the Clergy; and the French king had just been executed. The armies of the French Republic were in a state of disruption; the problems became even more acute following the introduction of mass conscription, the levée en masse, which saturated an already distressed army with thousands of illiterate, untrained men. For the French, the Rhine Campaign of 1795 proved especially disastrous, although they had achieved some success in other theatres of war (see for example, War of the Pyrenees (1793–95)).

=== Campaign in 1796 ===
Location map shows the battles and sieges of the 1796 Rhine Campaign.

The armies of the First Coalition included the imperial contingents and the infantry and cavalry of the various states, amounting to about 125,000 (including three autonomous corps), a sizable force by eighteenth century standards but a moderate force by the standards of the Revolutionary wars. In total, though, the commander-in-chief Archduke Charles' troops stretched from Switzerland to the North Sea and Dagobert Sigmund von Wurmser's, from the Swiss-Italian border to the Adriatic. Habsburg troops comprised the bulk of the army, but the thin white line of Habsburg infantry could not cover the territory from Basel to Frankfurt with sufficient depth to resist the pressure of their opponents. (Note: Habsburg infantry wore white coats. Gunther E. Rothenberg, "The Habsburg Army in the Napoleonic Wars (1792–1815)". Military Affairs, 37:1 (Feb 1973), 1–5.) Compared to French coverage, Charles had half the number of troops covering a 211-mile (340 km) front that stretched from Renchen near Basel to Bingen. Furthermore, he had concentrated the bulk of his force, commanded by Count Baillet Latour, between Karlsruhe and Darmstadt, where the confluence of the Rhine and the Main made an attack most likely, as it offered a gateway into eastern German states and ultimately to Vienna, with good bridges crossing a relatively well-defined river bank. To his north, Wilhelm von Wartensleben's autonomous corps (Note: An autonomous corps, in the Austrian or Imperial armies, was an armed force under command of an experienced field commander. They usually included two divisions, but probably not more than three, and function with high maneuverability and independent action, hence the name "autonomous corps." Some, called the Frei-Corps, or independent corps, were used as light infantry before the official formation of light infantry in the Habsburg Army in 1798. They provided the Army's skirmishing and scouting function; Frei-Corps were usually raised from the provinces. See Philip Haythornthwaite, Austrian Army of the Napoleonic Wars (1): Infantry. Osprey Publishing, 2012, p. 24. Military historians usually maintain that Napoleon solidified the use of the autonomous corps, armies that could function without a great deal of direction, scatter about the countryside, but reform again quickly for battle; this was actually a development that first emerged first in the French and Indian War in the Thirteen British Colonies and later in the American Revolutionary War, and became widely used in the European military as the size of armies grew in the 1790s and during the Napoleonic Wars. See David Gates, The Napoleonic Wars 1803–1815, New York, Random House, 2011, Chapter 6.) covered the line between Mainz and Giessen. The Austrian army consisted of professionals, many moved from the border regions in the Balkans, and conscripts drafted from the Imperial Circles. (Note: Beginning in the sixteenth century, the Holy Roman Empire was organized loosely into ten "circles", or regional groups of ecclesiastical, dynastic, and secular polities that coordinated economic, military and political actions. During times of war, the Circles contributed troops to the Habsburg military by drafting (or soliciting volunteers) among their inhabitants. Some circles coordinated their efforts better than others; the Swabian Circle was among the more effective of the imperial circles at organizing itself and protecting its economic interests. See James Allen Vann, The Swabian Kreis: Institutional Growth in the Holy Roman Empire 1648–1715. Vol. LII, Studies Presented to International Commission for the History of Representative and Parliamentary Institutions. Bruxelles, 1975. Mack Walker. German Home Towns: Community, State, and General Estate, 1648–1871. Ithaca, 1998.)

Two French generals, Jean-Baptiste Jourdan and Jean Victor Moreau, commanded (respectively) the Army of Sambre-et-Meuse and the Army of the Rhine and Moselle at the outset of the 1796 campaign. The French citizens' army, created by mass conscription of young men and systematically divested of old men who might have tempered the rash impulses of teenagers and young adults, and had already made itself odious, by reputation and rumor at least, throughout France. Furthermore, it was an army entirely dependent upon the countryside for its material support. After April 1796, pay was made in metallic value, but pay was still in arrears. Throughout the spring and early summer, the unpaid French army was in almost constant mutiny: in May 1796, in the border town of Zweibrücken, the 74th Demi-brigade revolted. In June, the 17th Demi-brigade was insubordinate (frequently) and in the 84th Demi-brigade, two companies rebelled. The French commanders understood that an assault into the German states was essential, not only in terms of war aims, but also in practical terms: the French Directory believed that war should pay for itself, and did not budget for the payment or feeding of its troops.

In Spring, 1796, when resumption of war appeared imminent, the 88 members of the Swabian Circle, which included most of the states (ecclesiastical, secular, and dynastic) in Upper Swabia, had raised a small force of about 7,000 men. These were literally raw recruits, field hands and day laborers drafted for service, but usually untrained in military matters. It was largely guess work where they should be placed, and Charles did not like to use the militias in any vital location. Consequently, in early late May and early June, when the French started to mass troops by Mainz as if they would cross there—they even engaged the Imperial force at Altenkirchen (4 June) and Wetzler and Uckerath (15 June)—Charles thought that main attack would occur there and felt few qualms placing the 7,000-man Swabian militia at the crossing by Kehl. On 24 June, though, at Kehl, Moreau's advance guard, 10,000, preceded the main force of 27,000 infantry and 3,000 cavalry directed at the Swabian pickets on the bridge. The Swabians were hopelessly outnumbered and could not be reinforced. Most of the Imperial Army of the Rhine was stationed further north, by Mannheim, where the river was easier to cross, but too far away to support the smaller force at Kehl. Neither the Condé's troops in Freiburg nor Karl Aloys zu Fürstenberg's force in Rastatt could reach Kehl in time to support them. Within a day, Moreau had four divisions across the river. Thrust out of Kehl, the Swabian contingent reformed at Rastatt by 5 July. There they managed to hold the city until the French turned both flanks. Charles could not move much of his army away from Mannheim or Karlsruhe, where the French had also formed across the river, and Fürstenberg could not hold the southern flank. Furthermore, at Hüningen, near Basel, on the same day that Moreau's advance guard crossed at Kehl, Ferino executed a full crossing, and advanced unopposed east along the German shore of the Rhine with the 16th and 50th Demi-brigades, the 68th, 50th and 68th line infantry, and six squadrons of cavalry that included the 3rd and 7th Hussars and the 10th Dragoons. (Note: The French Army designated two kinds of infantry: d'infanterie légère, or light infantry, to provide skirmishing cover for the troops that followed, principally d'infanterie de ligne, which fought in tight formations. Smith, p. 15.)

The Habsburg and Imperial armies were in danger of encirclement, as the French pressed hard at Rastatt. Ferino moved quickly east along the shore of the Rhine; from there, an approach from the rear might have flanked the entire force. To prevent this, Charles executed an orderly withdrawal in four columns through the Black Forest, across the Upper Danube valley, and toward Bavaria, trying to maintain consistent contact with all flanks as each column withdrew through the Black Forest and the Upper Danube. By mid-July, the column encamped near Stuttgart. The third column, which included the Condé's Corps, retreated through Waldsee to Stockach, and eventually Ravensburg. The fourth Austrian column, the smallest (three battalions and four squadrons), Ludwig Wolff de la Marselle, marched the length of the Bodensee's northern shore, via Überlingen, Meersburg, Buchhorn, and the Austrian city of Bregenz.

Given the size of the attacking force, Charles had to withdraw far enough into Bavaria to align his northern flank in a perpendicular line with Wartensleben's autonomous corps to protect the Danube valley and deny the French primary access to Vienna. His own front would prevent Moreau from flanking Wartensleben from the south and together they could resist the French onslaught. In the course of this withdrawal, he abandoned the Swabian Circle to the French. For the Swabians to negotiate neutrality, their militia needed to disband. At the end of July, eight thousand of Charles' men executed a dawn attack on the camp of the remaining three thousand Swabian and Condé's immigrant troops, disarmed them, and impounded their weapons. As Charles withdrew further east, the neutral zone established in Swabia expanded, eventually to encompass most of southern German states and the Ernestine duchies.

=== Summer of maneuvers ===
The summer and fall included various conflicts throughout the southern territories of the German states as the armies of the Coalition and the armies of the Directory sought to flank each other:

Principal conflicts in southern German states Rhine Campaign 1796
Date	Location	French	Imperial	Victor
4 June	Altenkirchen	20,000	20,000	French
15 June	Wetzlar and Uckerath	48,000	64,000	Austrian
23–24 June	Kehl	10,000	7,000	French
28 June	Rastatt	20,000	6,000	French
9 July	Ettlingen	36,000	32,000	French
11 August	Neresheim	47,000	43,000	French
24 August	Amberg	34,000	40,000	Imperial
24 August	Friedberg	59,000	35,500	French
3 September	Würzburg	30,000	30,000	Imperial
2 October	Biberach	35,000	15,000	French
19 October	Emmendingen	32,000	28,000	Imperial
24 October	Schliengen	32,000	24,000	Imperial
24 October – 9 January 1797	Kehl	20,000	40,000	Imperial
27 November – 1 February 1797	Hüningen	25,000	9,000	Imperial
Source: Digby Smith, Napoleonic Wars Data Book, Mechanicsburg, Pennsylvania: Stackpole Books, 1996, pp. 111–118.

By mid-summer, the situation looked grim for the Coalition: Wartensleben continued to withdraw to the east-northeast despite Charles' orders to unite with him. It appeared probable that Jourdan or Moreau would outmaneuver Charles by driving a wedge between his force and that of Wartensleben. At Neresheim on 11 August, Moreau crushed Charles' force, forcing him to withdraw further east. At last, however, with this loss, Wartensleben recognized the danger and changed direction, moving his corps to join at Charles' northern flank. At Amberg on 24 August, Charles inflicted a defeat on the French, yet that same day, his commanders lost a battle to the French at Friedberg. Regardless, the tide had turned in the Coalition's favor. Both Jourdan and Moreau had overstretched their lines, moving far into the German states, and were separated too far from each other for one to offer the other aid or security. The Coalition's concentration of troops forced a wider wedge between the two armies of Jourdan and Moreau, similar to what the French had tried to do to Charles and Wartensleben. As the French withdrew toward the Rhine, Charles and Wartensleben pressed forward. On 3 September at Würzburg, Jourdan attempted to halt his retreat. Once Moreau received word of the French defeat, he had to withdraw from southern Germany. He pulled his troops back through the Black Forest, with Ferino supervising the rear guard. The Austrian corps commanded by Latour drew too close to Moreau at Biberach and lost 4,000 men taken as prisoners, some standards and artillery, after which Latour followed at a more prudent distance.

== Terrain ==
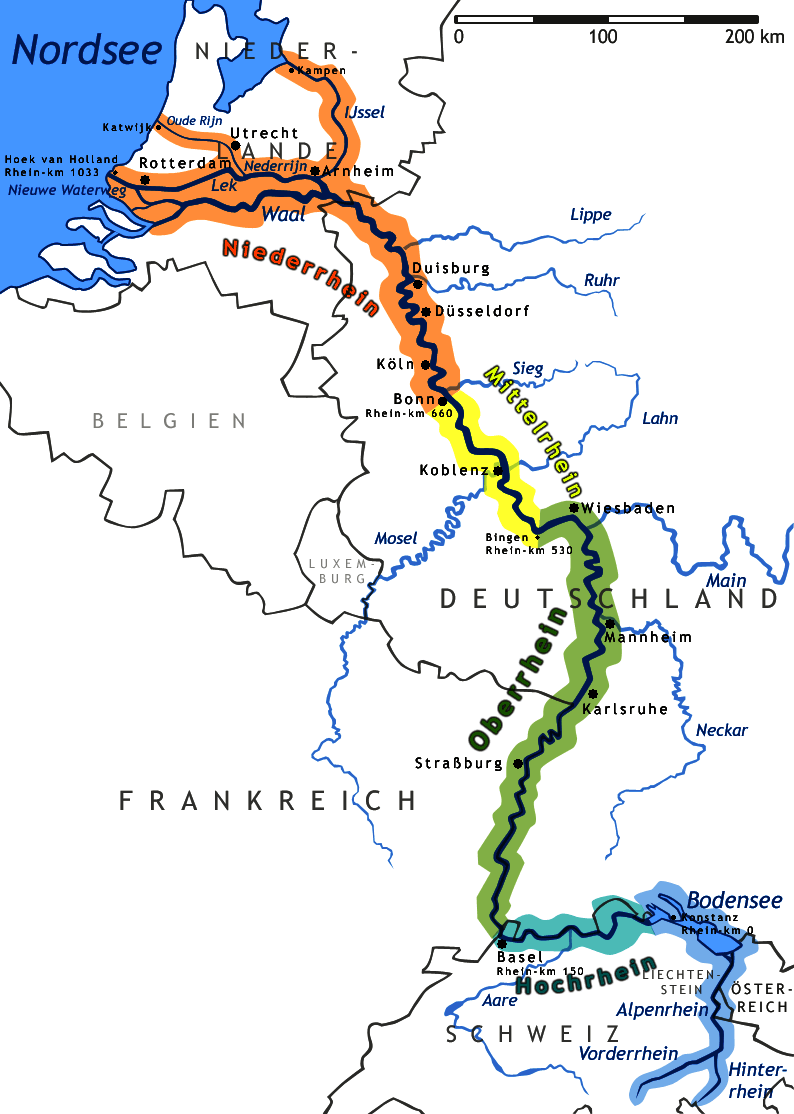
The Rhine River prevented easy escape into France.

The Rhine River flows west along the border between the German states and the Swiss Cantons. The High Rhine (Hochrhein), the 80-mile (130 km) stretch between the Rhine Falls near Schaffhausen and Basel, cuts through steep hillsides over a gravel bed; in such places as the former rapids at Laufenburg, it moves in torrents. A few miles north and east of Basel, the terrain flattens. The Rhine makes a wide, northerly turn, in what is called the Rhine knee, and enters the so-called Rhine ditch (Rheingraben), part of a rift valley bordered by the Black Forest on the east and Vosges mountains on the west. In 1796, the plain on both sides of the river, some 19 miles (31 km) wide, was dotted with villages and farms. At the farthest edges of the flood plain, especially on the eastern side, the old mountains created dark shadows on the horizon. Tributaries cut through the hilly terrain of the Black Forest, creating deep defiles in the mountains. The tributaries then wound in rivulets through the flood plain to the river.

The landscape was impressive, but rugged. As a nineteenth-century traveler described it,

the mountains in the vicinity [of Müllheim] are bold; the dark ravines contrasting with its sunny fronts offer some exquisite scenes. The Rhine ... lay revealed before us for many a league, twisting and twining like a serpent of silver ... dotted with innumerable islands, and flowing through a most extensive plain, perfectly flat. Our elevation was considerable and the eye ranged over a great extent of country: Elsace [sic], in France, and the level country as far as Bingen, would have been seen to their furthest limits had not the distance melted the extreme verges into 'thin air'. Many were the villages, and hamlets, and woods sprinkled over the landscape. [...]

The traveler described additional walks, in which the forest of dark pine bordered directly on the road, "checquered [sic] by glades in which browsed sheep and goats."

The Rhine River itself looked different in the 1790s than it does today; the passage from Basel to Iffezheim was "corrected" (straightened) between 1817 and 1875. Between 1927 and 1975, a canal was constructed to control the water level. In 1790, though, the river was wild and unpredictable, in some places four times wider or more than it is in the twenty-first century, even under regular water levels. Its channels wound through marsh and meadow, and created islands of trees and vegetation that were periodically submerged by floods.

== Battle ==
=== Key participants ===
Commanders
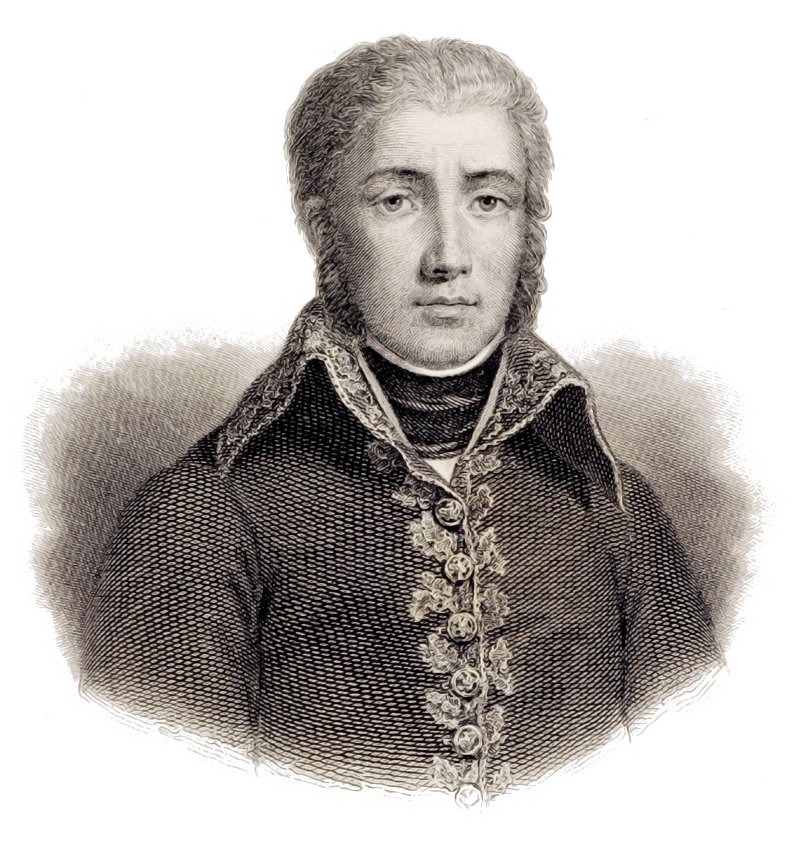
An ardent Republican, Moreau's skillful assault pushed his opponent's army far eastward into the south German states. His and Jourdan's failure to coordinate their movements led to their strategic withdrawal from the German states.

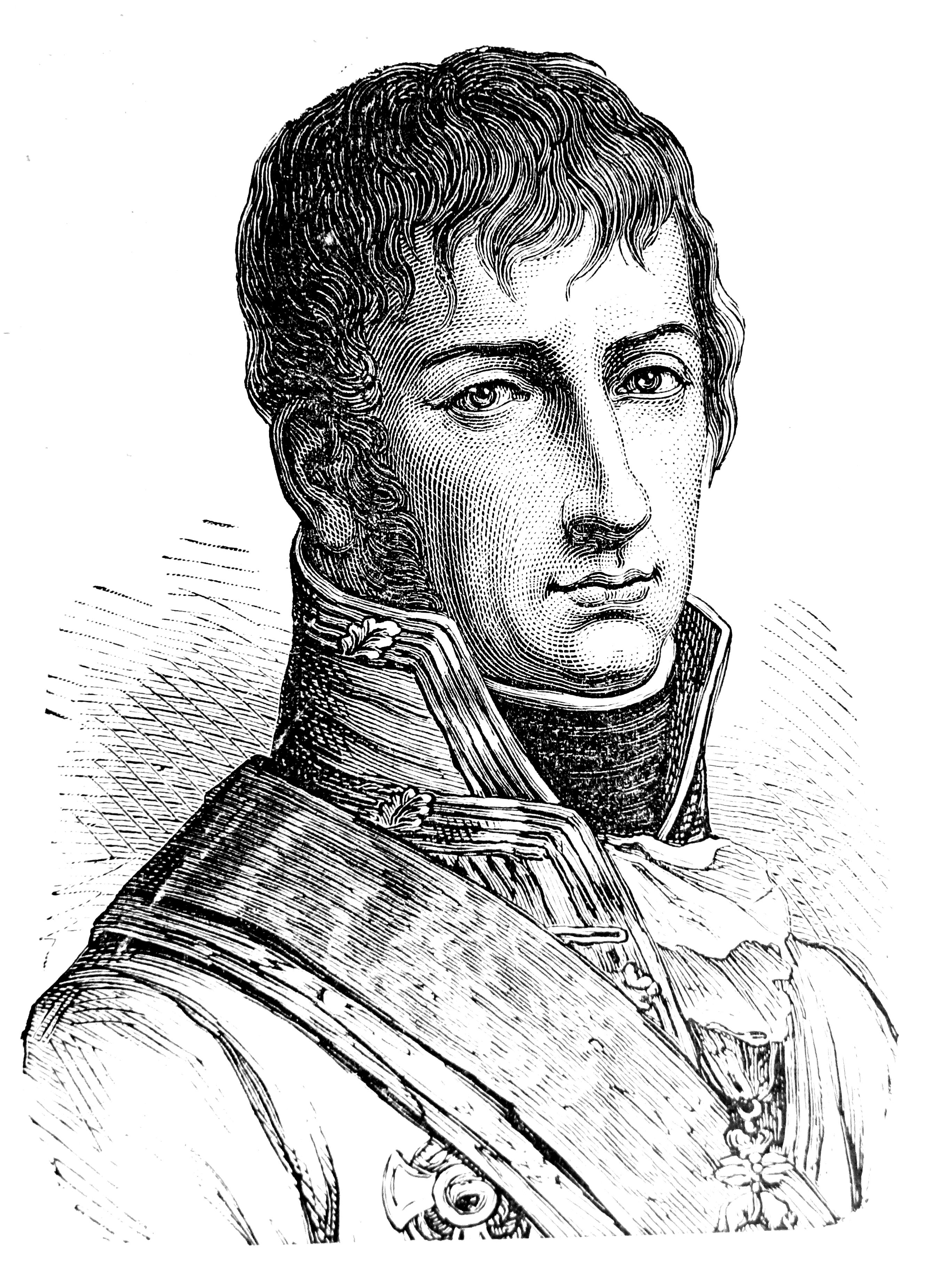
Brother of the Holy Roman Emperor, Archduke Charles held overall command of Habsburg forces in the south German states. By August, he linked his army with Wartensleben's, and was able to push his opponents Jourdan and Moreau back to the Rhine river.
Key Figures at the Battle
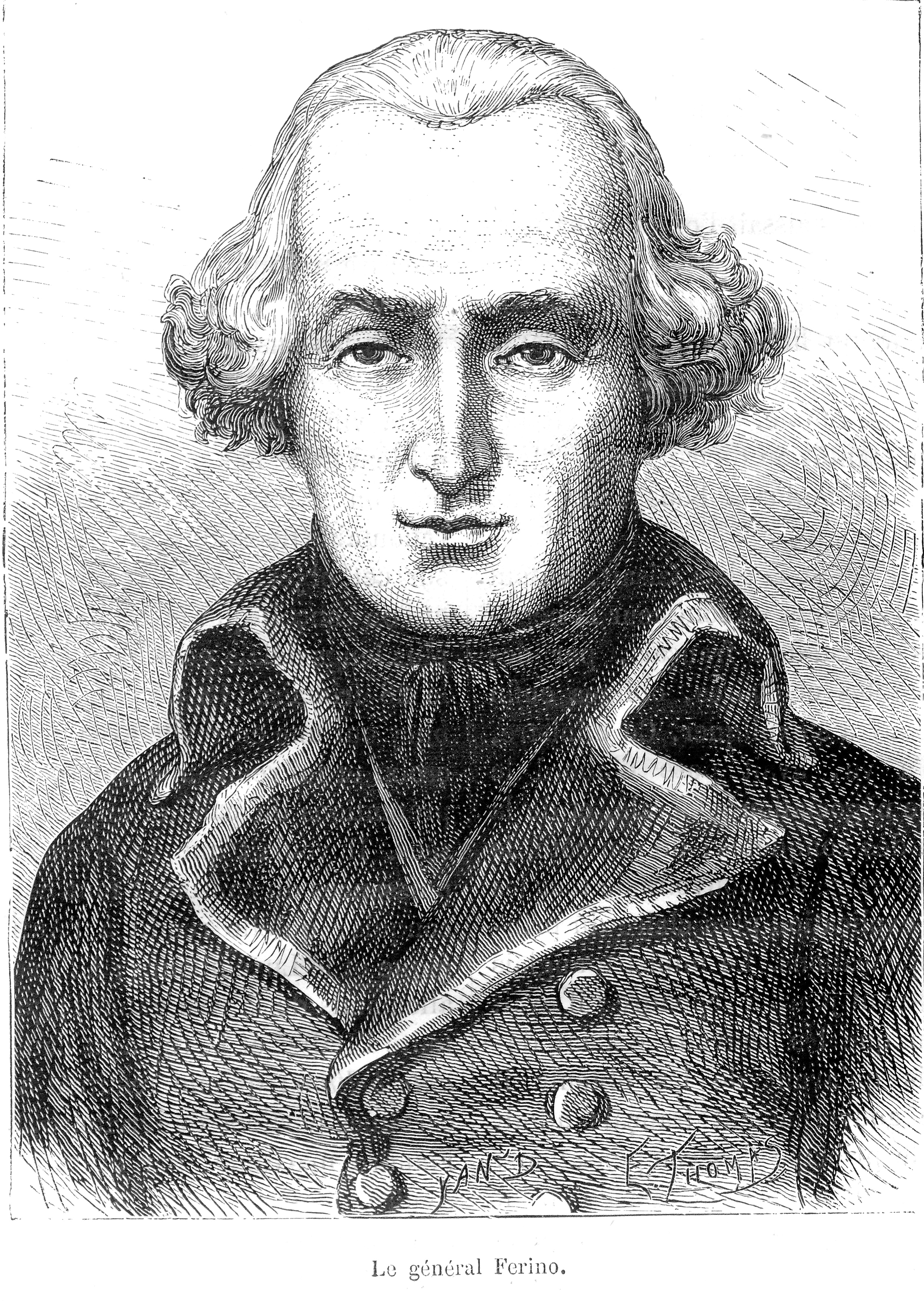
After uniting with Moreau's main army at Freiburg, Ferino withdrew along the High Rhine, to guard the southern flank of Moreau's army. Their united force defended French positions in the southwestern corner of Germany, along the Rhine corridor and eventually covered Moreau's withdrawal to France.

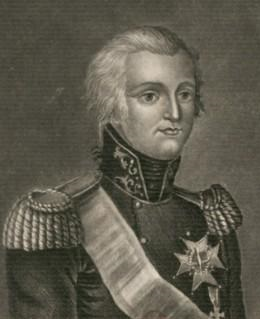
The enthusiastic Louis Antoine, Duke of Enghien led the French Émigré Army in a fierce flanking maneuver, including a bayonet charge on the village of Steinstadt, to overwhelm Republican forces.

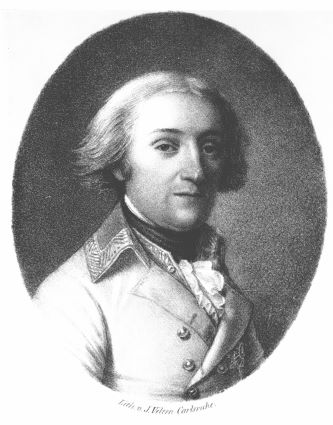
The young but reliable Fürstenburg commanded the second column of nine battalions and 26 squadrons. Quick action by Fürstenburg's column prevented the French from escaping the Austrian net.

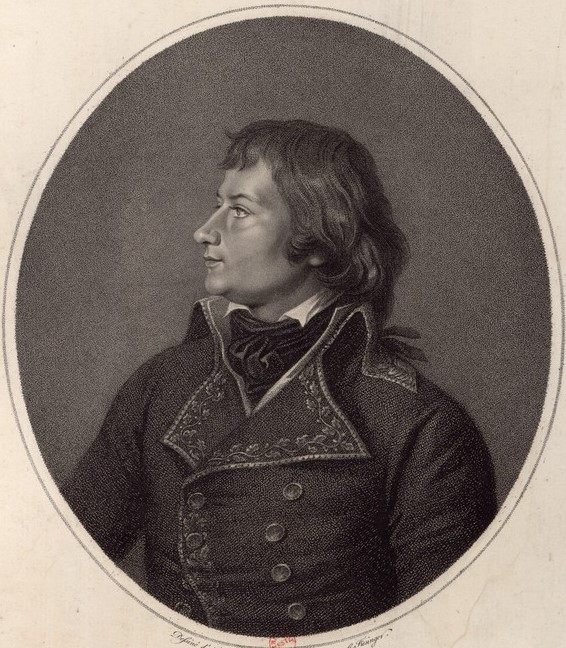
Saint Cyr attempted several times to retake the territory claimed from him by Fürstenburg, but to no avail.

=== Preliminaries to the action at Schliengen ===
Throughout September and early October, Charles maintained his pressure on Moreau's army, pushing it further to the west. On 18 September, part of an Austrian division under Feldmarschall-Leutnant Petrasch swept from Karlsruhe, south to Kehl and stormed the Rhine bridgehead there; he succeeded in holding it, with high losses (about 2,000 of his 5,000 men were killed, wounded or missing). Immediately, though, General Schauenburg, the French garrison commander, counter-attacked and drove the Austrians back; the French lost 1,200 killed or wounded, and 800 captured. Even though the French still held the crossing at Kehl and Strasbourg, Petrasch's Austrians prevented Moreau from using the crossing to escape, leaving the bridge at Hüningen as his only reliable route to France. If Moreau, at that point situated in Freiburg, withdrew too soon from the Breisgau, Pierre Marie Barthélemy Ferino 's column would be trapped there.

The next contact occurred on 19 October at Emmendingen, in the Elz valley which winds through the Black Forest. The section of the valley involved in the battle runs southwest through the mountains from Elzach, through Bleibach and Waldkirch. Just to the southwest of Waldkirch, the river emerges from the mountains and flows north-west towards the Rhine, with the Black Forest to its right. This section of the river passes through Emmendingen before it reaches Riegel. Riegel sits in a narrow gap between the Black Forest and an isolated outcropping of volcanic hills known as the Kaiserstuhl. Here the archduke split his force into four columns.

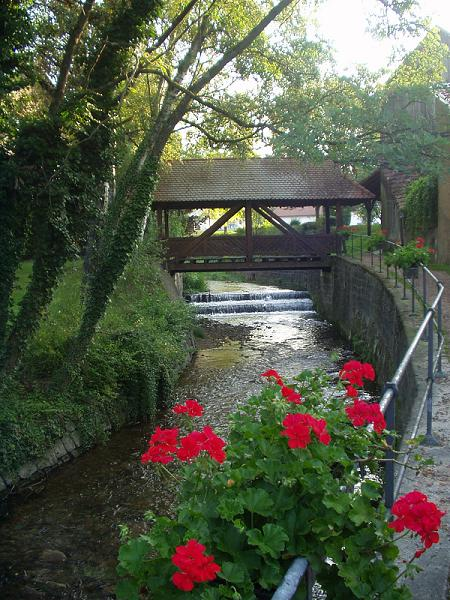
In 1796 the Kander river (pictured in 2007) offered another defensive obstacle.

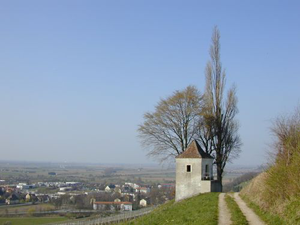
The line of battle extended from Habsburg territory of the Breisgau into the Duke of Baden's Markgräflerland, and over areas rich in vineyards.

Column Nauendorf, in the upper Elz, had 8 battalions and 14 squadrons, advancing southwest to Waldkirch; column Wartensleben had 12 battalions and 23 squadrons advancing south to capture the Elz bridge at Emmendingen. Latour, with 6,000 men, was to cross the foothills via Heimbach and Malterdingen, and capture the bridge of Köndringen, between Riegel and Emmendingen, and column Fürstenberg held Kinzingen, about 2 miles (3.2 km) north of Riegel. Michael Fröhlich and Condé (part of Friedrich Joseph, Count of Nauendorf's column) were to pin down Ferino and the French right wing in the Stieg valley. Nauendorf's men were able to ambush Saint' Cyr's advance; Latour's columns attacked Beaupuy at Matterdingen, killing the general and throwing his column into confusion. Wartensleben, in the center, was held up by French riflemen until his third (reserve) detachment arrived to outflank them. In the ensuing melee, Wartensleben was mortally wounded. The French retreated across the rivers, destroying all the bridges. (Note: Wartensleben later died of his wounds. Smith, p. 125.)

Lack of bridges did not slow the Coalition pursuit. The Austrians repaired the bridges by Matterdingen, and moved on Moreau at Freiburg. On 20 October, Moreau's army of 20,000 united south of Freiburg im Breisgau with Ferino's column. Ferino's force was smaller than Moreau had hoped, bringing the total of the combined French force to about 32,000. Charles' combined forces of 24,000 closely followed Moreau's rear guard from Freiburg, southwest, to a line of hills stretching between Kandern and the river.

=== French dispositions ===
After a retreat of approximately 38 miles (61 km) in which his rear guard was continually harassed by the vanguard of his enemy, Moreau halted at Schliengen and distributed his army in a 7.5-mile (12 km) semicircle along a ridge that commanded the approaches from Freiburg. He placed his right wing, commanded by Ferino, at the neighboring heights of Kandern (altitude 1,155 feet (352 m)) and Sitzenkirch, and his left wing at Steinstadt. His center occupied the village of Schliengen (altitude 820 feet or 250 meters), which lay about 3 miles (5 km) from the Rhine river. His entire force guarded a front protected by a small stream, the 14-mile (23 km) long Kander that meandered out of the mountains west of Kandern and plunged 755 feet (230 m) into the Rhine when it passed Steinstadt. For extra protection, Moreau also posted a body of infantry in front of his center, giving it added depth. His position on the heights gave him the advantage in any approach; his troops could fire downhill on any advancing troops. The French position, in the chain of abrupt and woody heights, seemed nearly impregnable.

=== Austrian strategy ===
The Austrian army, augmented by the Army of Condé under the prince's command, approached from Freiburg. Charles had a couple of options open to him. Any direct assault on the French position would be costly; Moreau had chosen an almost unassailable position, especially for his center. Any Habsburg force would have to cross the Kandern; in most cases, it would have to advance uphill into withering fire. Charles could avoid a battle by leaving a force to keep the French occupied and directing a part of his army through the mountains to the left of the Kandern, descending into the valley to Wies and disrupt the French line with Hüningen. (Note: Charles did have small force attack at Rheinfelden; if successful, the small Austrian force there could swing quickly around behind the hill at Schliengen and cut off Moreau's access to Hüningen. However, when Ferino withdrew through Rheinfelden, he had destroyed the bridge. See Philippart, p. 100.) However, this operation would take time, and the roads were bad from the rain, making any such maneuver difficult.

Rather than see his enemy slip from his grasp, Charles decided to turn Moreau's right flank at Kandern. He redistributed the four columns: Condé's Emigré Corps formed the far right column, and Condé's grandson, Louis Antoine, Duke of Enghien, commanded its vanguard; the second column, commanded by the young but reliable Karl Aloys zu Fürstenberg, included 9 battalions and 26 squadrons. Charles ordered the first two columns to keep the left wing of the French army in check, preventing it from swinging around his own army's rear in a flanking maneuver. This force also maintained contact with Petrasch's force by Kehl.

The third column, commanded by the experienced Maximilian Anton Karl, Count Baillet de Latour, included 11 battalions and 2 regiments of cavalry. The fourth, commanded by the dependable Friedrich Joseph, Count of Nauendorf, included the entire vanguard of Charles' corps and approached on the far Austrian left. The two larger columns, under Latour and Nauendorf, were to attack the French right wing in force, and to turn it so that the French army's back was to the Rhine. This was by far the most grueling of the proposed advances: they would approach the French uphill from them. Nauendorf divided his column into several smaller groups, and approached Kandern from several sides, up the steep slopes, by coordinating contact between his column and Latour's, using Maximilian, Count of Merveldt's regiment as the link between them.

=== Combat ===
Condé's Corps formed down river at Neuburg and Karl Aloys zu Fürstenberg's column formed at Müllheim. Their role was specific: keep the French left from flanking the main Austrian force. Yet, despite specific orders to the contrary, the Duke of Enghien, Condé's grandson, led a spirited attack on Steinstadt with the Army of Condé; they took the village with a bayonet charge and remained there under severe artillery and musket fire for the rest of the daylight hours. Republican fire continued, incessant and terrible. An officer was killed as he stood between the Royal Highnesses (Condé, his son, and grandson) and the Duke of Berry. Taking advantage of the royalist acquisition, the second column took the hill opposite Schliengen, which was heavily defended by General of Division Gouvion Saint-Cyr. Saint-Cyr tried several times to retake the position, but Fürstenberg's column clung to its prize throughout the day, despite a heavy cannonade from the French divisions opposite it.

On the opposite side of the battlefield, Latour's column marched through part of the night to Feldburg, passed through Vögisheim at 47°47′N 7°37′E to Feldberg, after which it separated into two smaller columns. At 07:00, the right column attacked Ferino's positions in two vineyards which lay approximately 6 miles (10 km) to the northeast at 47°46′0.12″N 7°39′0.00″E. This column forced the French to retire behind Liel at 47°45′N 7°36′E, 0.8 miles (1 km) east of Schliengen. The left column, meanwhile, had attacked another position by Egennen. After fierce fighting, Latour's column dislodged the French after obstinate resistance; the second portion of Latour's column approached the hamlet Eckenheim from the reverse angle, and forced a French contingent from the village. Grueling combat followed as the Austrians made the steep, uphill advance.

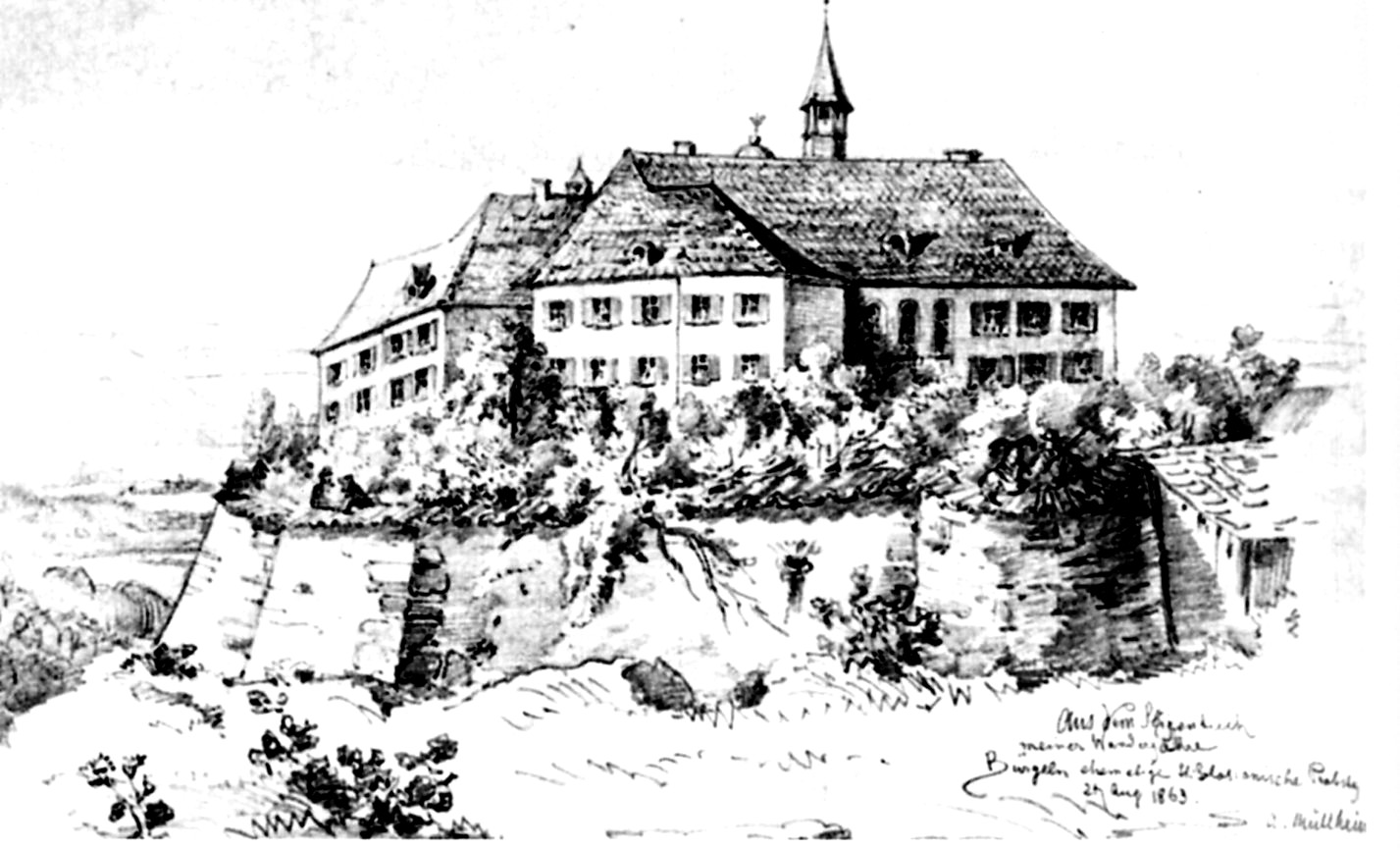
At Bürgeln, Nauendorf's column separated from Latour's and marched through the morning to attack Ferino's troops in a vineyard.

The greater part of the battle, yet to come, fell to Nauendorf's column. His men had marched all of the preceding night; his column moved with the corps of General Latour to Feldburg, but by the castle of Bürgeln 3.9 miles (6 km) to the east at 47°44′0″N 7°49′0″E, it turned to the left (west) to penetrate to the source of the Kandern stream. Finally, by 14:00, two in the afternoon, Nauendorf's column had slogged through mud and muck and came fully into the action. Despite determined opposition, his troops ousted the French from Kandern and Sitzenkirch, and all the high ground above the river and Feuerbach. The fighting there, between Ferino's and Nauendorf's columns, was intense and horrific: Moreau later recounted that Ferino's troops performed "prodigies of valor" from daybreak to nightfall. When Nauendorf finished pushing the French from Kandern, and two hamlets beside it, and he sent a note with this information to Latour. As the battle finished, a ferocious storm unleashed hail and wind. So ended the first day of the battle during which Charles' army had successfully ousted both French flanks from their positions. Overnight, Charles drew up his plans to attack the French center on the following morning. It promised to be a long and bloody second day.

=== Withdrawal ===
Moreau appreciated his untenable position, especially on his right where the bulk of Charles' force stood ready to attack again in the morning. The Austrian army occupied a line which passed obliquely across the extremity of his right, and another line which passed along his left; they intersected in front of him, where the main force of Charles' army blocked any movement forward. With luck, his troops might hold the Austrians off another day, but there were hazards: principally, the Austrians could break either wing, swing behind him and cut him off from the bridge at Hüningen, which was his only escape route back to France. Consequently, that night he withdrew his right wing to the heights of Tannenkirch at 47°43′N 7°37′E, a position scarcely less impregnable than that which it had abandoned. With a strong rear guard provided by Abbatucci and Lariboisière, he abandoned his position the same night and retreated part of the 9.7 miles (16 km) to Hüningen. The right and left wings followed. By 3 November he had reached Haltingen and evacuated his troops over the bridge into France.

== Aftermath ==
With their backs to the river, Ferino and Moreau had to retreat across the Rhine into France, but retained control of the fortifications at Kehl and Hüningen and, more importantly, the tête-de-pont of the star-shaped fortresses where the bridges crossed the river. Moreau offered an armistice to Charles, which the archduke was inclined to accept. He wanted to secure the Rhine crossings and send troops to northern Italy to relieve Dagobert Sigmund von Wurmser at besieged Mantua; an armistice with Moreau would allow him to do that. However, his brother, Francis II, the Holy Roman Emperor, and the civilian military advisers of the Aulic Council categorically refused such an armistice, forcing Charles to order simultaneous sieges at Kehl and Hüningen. These tied his army to the Rhine for most of the winter. He moved north with the bulk of his force to invest Kehl, and instructed Karl Aloys zu Fürstenberg to conduct the siege in the south by Basel. While the Austrians besieged these Rhine crossings, Moreau had sufficient surplus troops to send 14 demi-brigades (approximately 12,000 troops) into Italy to assist in the siege at Mantua.

Preceded by Battle of Emmendingen	French Revolution: Revolutionary campaigns Battle of Schliengen	Succeeded by Second Battle of Bassano
