= Michael von Fröhlich =

Michael, Freiherr von Fröhlich (9 January 1740 – 1814) was a German general officer serving in army of the Austrian Empire, notably during the Wars of the French Revolution.

== Service ==
Fröhlich was born in Marburg in Hesse, Germany, and by 1778 was a Major commanding infantry in the Warasdin district of Croatia. During the War of the Bavarian Succession he headed a surprise attack on the fort at Dittersbach and captured 110 prisoners. In 1783 he became Oberstleutnant (lieutenant colonel) and in 1788 Oberst (colonel). On 27 May 1789 during the war against Turkey he defended Dobroselo with Oberst Weiler for over 10 hours with only 1,500 men against 10,000 enemies.

Promoted General-major in 1793, he served in Franz von Werneck's division under Prince Josias of Saxe-Coburg-Saalfeld in the Austrian Netherlands in 1794. In 1795 he fought on the Rhine at Mannheim. In 1796 Fröhlich was promoted to Feldmarschall-Leutnant and commanded a mixed column of Austrian, Émigré and Kreis-Armee soldiers on the left wing of the Army of the Upper Rhine under Dagobert Sigmund von Wurmser. From 18 June 1796 he served under Maximilian Anton Karl, Count Baillet de Latour. Following Moreau's crossing of the Rhine he was cut off 24 June, but was able to reunite with the forces of the Archduke Charles at Nördlingen on 10 August. He was then made commander of the 11,000 man corps connected to Latour on the Lech in the Vorarlberg. He served at the combat of Kammlach 13th, then the following month faced Pierre Marie Barthélemy Ferino on the upper Iller and Tyrol, pursuing him during Moreau's retreat to the Rhine. Fröhlich joined with Charles and Latour to defeat Moreau at the Battle of Emmendingen on 19 October 1796 and Battle of Schliengen five days later.

In 1799 he was made Colonel Proprietor (Inhaber) of Infantry Regiment Nr. 28 and commanded a 14,000 man division in Italy. His command saw action at the Battle of Verona on 26 March 1799 and acted as the Reserve at the Battle of the Trebia on 19 June. He occupied Plaisance, and was at the Battle of Novi on 15 August 1799. He then took command of troops in Tuscany and the Papal States, besieging and eventually capturing Ancona.

From 1803 to 1810 he was Commandant of the Fortress of Olmütz, then went into retirement and died at the age of 74 in Troppau, Silesia.

Military offices
Preceded by Wilhelm von Wartensleben	Proprietor (Inhaber) of Infantry Regiment N°28 (1799-1814)	Succeeded by
