= Ville-au-Val =

- Commune
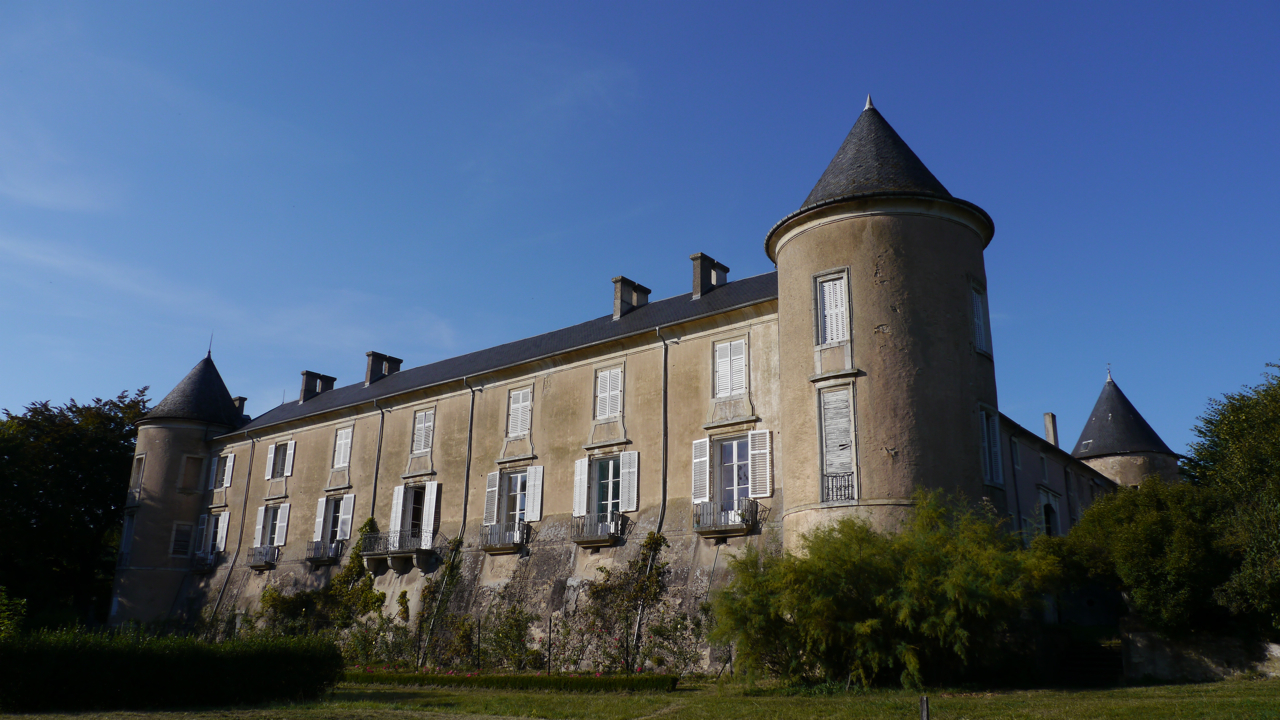
- The chateau in Ville-au-Val

- Coat of arms
- Location of Ville-au-Val
- Location within France Location within Grand Est
- Coordinates: 48°50′57″N 6°07′19″E
- Country: France
- Region: Grand Est
- Department: Meurthe-et-Moselle
- Arrondissement: Nancy
- Canton: Entre Seille et Meurthe
- Intercommunality: CC Bassin de Pont-à-Mousson

Government
  - Mayor (2023–2026): David Girard
- Area^{1}: 5.79 km^{2} (2.24 sq mi)
- Elevation: 230 m (750 ft)
- Highest elevation: 377 m (1,237 ft)
- Lowest elevation: 195 m (640 ft)
- Population (2023): 177
  - Density: 30.6/km^{2} (79.2/sq mi)
- Time zone: UTC+01:00 (CET)
  - Summer (DST): UTC+02:00 (CEST)
- INSEE/Postal code: 54569 /54380
- ^{1} French Land Register data, which excludes lakes, ponds, glaciers > 1 km^{2} (0.386 sq mi or 247 acres) and river estuaries.

Ville-au-Val (French pronunciation: [vil o val]) is a commune in the Meurthe-et-Moselle department in north-eastern France.

== See also ==
- Communes of the Meurthe-et-Moselle department
