= Army of Condé =

Military unit

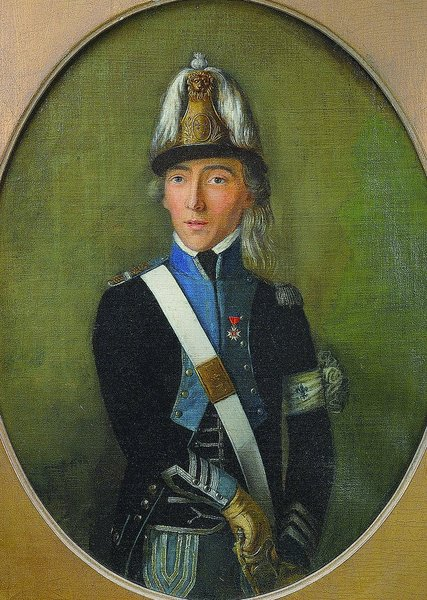
- Portrait of an officer of the Army of Condé
- Leader: (Kingdom of France) Louis Joseph de Bourbon
- Dates active: 1791–1801
- Allegiance: Kingdom of France; House de Bourbon
- Ideology: Monarchism
- Size: 5,000–10,000 men
- Part of: (Kingdom of France) Armée des Émigrés

The Army of Condé (French: Armée de Condé) was a French field army during the French Revolutionary Wars. One of several émigré field armies, it was the only one to survive the War of the First Coalition; others had been formed by the Comte d'Artois (brother of King Louis XVI) and Mirabeau-Tonneau. The émigré armies were formed by aristocrats and nobles who had fled from the violence in France after the August Decrees. The army was commanded by Louis Joseph de Bourbon, Prince de Condé, the cousin of Louis XVI. Among its members were Condé's grandson the Duc d'Enghien, and the two sons of the Comte d'Artois, and so the army was sometimes also called the Princes' Army.

Financial difficulties forced Condé to appeal to foreign courts for support. Although the Army of Condé fought in conjunction with the Austrian army, many of the generals in Habsburg service distrusted Louis Joseph, and policy makers in Vienna considered the army and its officers unreliable. Furthermore, conflicting goals of the French royalists and the Habsburgs frequently placed Louis Joseph at odds with the Habsburg military leadership.

== Composition of the army ==
Other than the princes, it also included many young aristocrats such as the Duc de Richelieu, the Duc de Blacas and Chateaubriand, the Duc de Choiseul, the Comte de Langéron, the Comte de Damas, the Comte de Montlosier and the Vicomte de Bonald. The insistence of the officers on the same pay to which they were entitled in France created problems for their funders, which included Spain, Portugal, and Naples, and Britain, and finally, Russia. The British funded the army the longest, from 1795 to 1797, and again, in 1799 until its dissolution in 1801.

Originally about 25,000 men, the size of the Princes' Army fluctuated with casualties and available funds. By the end of 1792, the force had shrunk to 5,000 men. After recruiting in 1796, in Mainz, Mannheim, and the Swiss cantons, it could call on 10,000 men, under the pay of Britain.

=== Structure ===
The composition of the army varied: the regiments of Mirabeau, Rohan and Salms, for example, were almost independent corps.

== Conflicting goals ==
The army of the émigrés had but a single goal, to invade France, end the Revolution, and restore Bourbon rule. However, the various nations who funded the army were less interested in restoring order in France than in gaining new territory for themselves and keeping the Revolution confined within French borders. This often led to friction between the Prince's Army and its benefactors, particularly the Austrians. At one point the Emperor put the Condé himself under arrest for insubordination.

== Military service ==
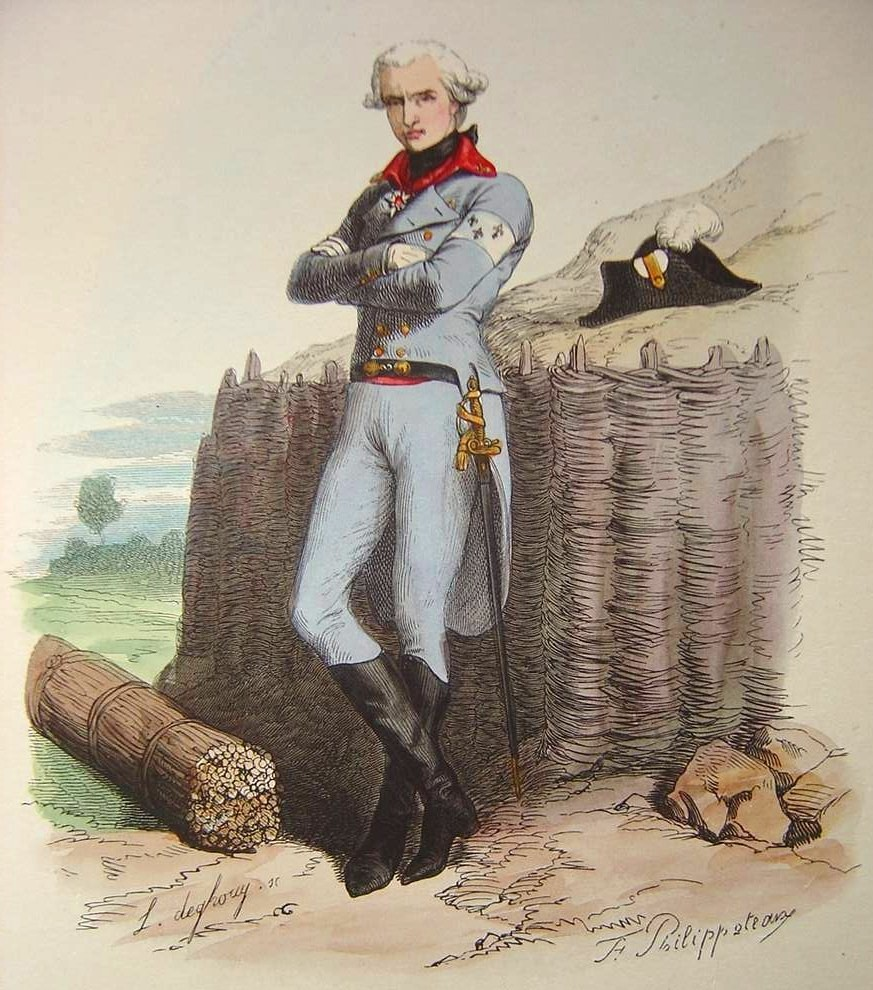
Infantry officer of the Army of Condé

This army participated in the War of the First Coalition from 1792 to 1797 alongside Austria, initially sharing in the unsuccessful invasion of France by the Allies under Charles William Ferdinand, Duke of Brunswick. At Metz, 3–4000 French republicans faced an Austrian-Émigré siege force of 20,000. Expecting the fortress to surrender without a fight, the Austrians and émigrés under command of the Prince of Bourbon, did not bring any siege cannon. Although losses were slight (about 10 killed or wounded), the failure to take Thionville from 2 battalions of Infantry and some National Guardsmen rankled. In the previous 3 weeks, Austrians and Prussian forces had successfully forced the capitulation of Longwy and Verdun. Two weeks later, after the cannonade at Valmy, the émigré army and the Austrians, did not get to the battlefield until most of the fighting was over and the Prussians were withdrawing.

By 1795, the Army of Condé fought in conjunction with the Austrian army, under command of Archduke Charles, Duke of Teschen. In 1794, through the negotiations of William Wickham, the British agreed to pay the Corps' expenses. In June 1796, the Condé's army and the Swabian Circle contingent guarded the Rhine river crossing at Kehl, but were pushed out when the French crossed the river in force on June 26. Afterward, the Condé's corps and the Contingent fought in Swabia, as part of the division of Karl Aloys von Fürstenberg. After the contingent was disbanded, the Corps remained in Swabia, participating in the summer fighting Swabia. In October 1796, at the Battle of Schliengen, the Corps made a spirited attack on the village of Steinstadt, which they took with a bayonet charge and remained there under severe artillery and musket fire for the rest of the daylight hours. Charles was so pleased with the performance of the Corps that he sent a formal congratulatory note to the Prince.

After the interim cease fire, the Corps garrisoned in the region of Lake Constance. The agreement negotiated between Conde and Wickham expired and the Corps entered the pay of the Tsar of Russia. In October, the entire Corps, numbering about 10,000, left the Bodensee region and marched toward Russia. In October 1797, Austria signed the Treaty of Campo Formio with the French First Republic, formally ending its hostilities against the French. With the end of the First Coalition, the army marched to Poland, returning in 1799 to Switzerland under command of Alexander Suvorov. In 1800, when Russia left the Second Coalition, the British agreed once again to pay the Conde's army and it fought in Bavaria until 1801, when the Corps was disbanded.

== See also ==
- House of Bourbon
- Louis Antoine, Duke of Enghien
- Chasseurs Britanniques
