= François Antoine Louis Bourcier =

French general and politician

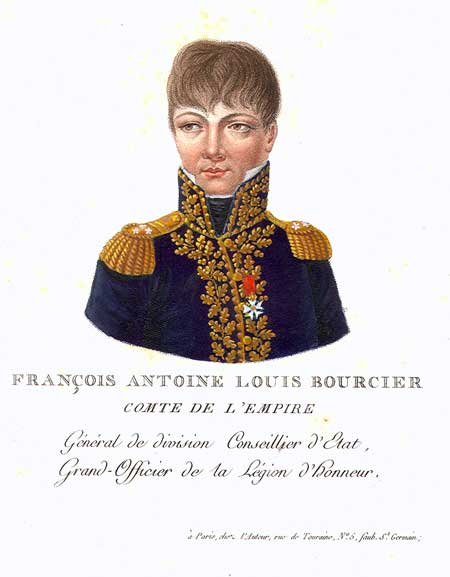
- Count of the Empire, General of Division, Counselor of State Conseiller d'Etat, Grand Officer of the Legion d'Honneur
- Born: 23 February 1760; La Petite-Pierre Alsace
- Died: 8 May 1828 (aged 68) Ville-au-Val Meurthe-et-Moselle
- Allegiance: French Republic; Kingdom of France
- Branch: Cavalry
- Service years: 1789–1814
- Rank: General of Division
- Conflicts: War of the First Coalition; War of the Second Coalition; Army of the Danube; Battle of Ostrach; Battle of Stockach; Army of Helvetia; First Battle of Zurich; Army of Naples; War of the Third Coalition; Upper Danube Campaign; Battle of Elchingen; Battle of Austerlitz; War of the Fourth Coalition; Battle of Jena-Auerstadt; Peninsular War; War of the Fifth Coalition; Battle of Wagram; Grand Army in Germany; French invasion of Russia; War of the Sixth Coalition
- Awards: Grand Officer, Legion of Honor, Chevalier, Cross of St. Louis
- Other work: Chamber of Deputies of France

François Antoine Louis Bourcier (French pronunciation: [fʁɑ̃swa ɑ̃twan lwi buʁsje]; 23 February 1760 – 8 May 1828) was a French cavalry officer and divisional general of the French Revolutionary Wars and the Napoleonic Wars.

Bourcier was a cavalry lieutenant when the French Revolution fighting with the Army of the Rhine in the War of the First Coalition. By the War of the Second Coalition, he had been promoted to brigadier general, and served in the Army of the Danube as inspector general of cavalry. In the Napoleonic Wars, he fought at major campaigns on the Danube against Austria and Russia, including the battles of Elchingen, Austerlitz and the Battle of Wagram. He also participated in the campaign against Prussia, which culminated in the Battle of Jena-Auerstadt and the battles of Heilsberg and Friedland. Following the campaign in Prussia, he served briefly in the Peninsular War after he which he was transferred back to northern Europe and participated in the French Invasion of Russia in 1812. Following the defeat of Napoleon in 1815, he retained his titles and honours.

== Career ==
Bourcier was born in La Petite-Pierre near Phalsbourg, Alsace, a small town, in the Bas-Rhin district, 24 kilometers (15 mi) north of Saverne and 56 kilometers (35 mi) northwest of Strasbourg. The son of a former sergeant of the guard of King Stanislas Leszczynski, he proved himself a bright student in school, and was placed in a cavalry regiment. At the beginning of the French Revolution in 1789, he was lieutenant in the 1st Regiment of Cavalry. From this time, his prospects rose quickly. Appointed aide-de-campe to the Duke of Aiguillon (9 June 1792), he later he transferred to the staff of General Adam Philippe, Comte de Custine. A general of brigade in 1793, he became Chief of Staff of the Army of the Rhine, and was raised the following year to the rank of major general.

Bourcier commanded a division of cavalry under General Jean Victor Marie Moreau, who had taken an interest in his career, and he was appointed Inspector of Cavalry on 3 August 1797. When Jean Baptiste Jourdan formed the Army of the Danube, he appointed Bourcier as inspector of cavalry for both his force and the Army of Switzerland, under command of André Masséna. With command of a brigade, and as inspector of cavalry, Bourcier participated in the campaigns of the War of the Second Coalition in southwestern Germany, Switzerland, and northern Italy. In Italy, he also commanded a column of cavalry that routed a group of rebels near Andrea.

In the 1805 War of the Third Coalition, as commander of a division of dragoons, he participated in the Battle of Elchingen and later the Battle of Ulm. Six weeks later, at the Battle of Austerlitz, he made several brilliant and timely charges, including one observed by several parishioners of the town of Mönitz, who had climbed the church tower to watch the action. The French infantry had been surrounded by Austrian cavalry, which pursued them down the road. Bourcier approached from the other direction with three regiments of dragoons, having left the rest of his division behind to preserve his communication lines in Raigern. Seeing the infantry beleaguered by cavalry, he led his men in a charge, giving the infantry time to escape. His own dragoons were fired upon with cannon and grapeshot, killing or wounding several men and horses, but, as he wrote later, "[the Russian cannon fire] would have done more harm had they been directed better, being within half range."

After the French victory at the Battle of Jena-Auerstadt, Bourcier was placed in charge of the several thousands of horses confiscated from the Prussians. This influx of horses improved the capacity of the French cavalry, as Joachim Murat's 11,000-strong cavalry reserve demonstrated later at the Battle of Eylau in February 1807.

After the defeat of Prussia in 1807, Bourcier was sent to Spain to support the French efforts there, but he returned to the northern European theater in time for the Battle of Wagram in July 1809. He was also part of Napoleon's Russian campaign, but escaped the rigors of the retreat from Moscow, having been previously sent back to Berlin to reorganize the French cavalry.

The First Restoration awarded him the Cross of St. Louis. He retired in 1816, but the following year he was recalled to the State Council and served as commissioner for the management of military supply depots.

== Family and post-military life ==
In 1809, he acquired the Chateau de Ville-au-Val at Meurthe-et-Moselle. In 1816, he was elected to the Chamber of Deputies by the Department of the Meurthe. He married Marie Isabelle Van Oldencel (died in Nancy, 13 June 1855). They had a daughter, Adelaide Ernestine Josephine, born 11 October 1805, who married to Louis Henry Gau, the son of Charles Louis Joseph Gau of Frégeville.

Bourcier died in 1828 in Ville-au-Val in Meurthe-et-Moselle and was buried, as were his descendants after him, in the family vault near the chateau chapel. His name is engraved on the Arc d'Triumph.
