= James Allen Vann =

American historian

James Allen Vann III
- Born: November 20, 1939; Birmingham Alabama
- Died: May 4, 1986 (aged 46); Atlanta Georgia
- Resting place: Elmwood Cemetery, Birmingham, Alabama
- Education: Washington and Lee University, 1961; Harvard University, 1970.
- Occupation: Historian
- Known for: The Swabian Kreis: Institutional Growth in the Holy Roman Empire, 1648-1715 and other books

James Allen Vann III (November 20, 1939 – May 4, 1986) was an American historian, specializing in German history of the early modern period. He was a professor of history at Emory University. Born in Birmingham, Alabama, he graduated from Washington and Lee University, where he graduated summa cum laude in 1961. He served two years in the army, then entered Harvard University, where he received the Doctorate of Philosophy (Ph.D.) in 1970. He joined the faculty of the University of Michigan that same year. He served on the faculty of the École des Hautes Études en Sciences Sociales in Paris from 1983–84. Following his assignment there, he joined the faculty at Emory University in Atlanta.

His 1975 work, The Swabian Kreis: Institutional Growth in the Holy Roman Empire, 1648–1715, established Vann among a group of young scholars whose new vision of the historical Holy Roman Empire challenged classical notions of that institution's viability and functionality. In his study of Württemberg, he rejected traditional ideas of state building as a conscious social determinism, but instead explained the evolution of a German state in terms of relations between and among the dukes and the courtiers, privy councilors and the general representative body of the Landtag.

Since 1985, the James Allen Vann Seminar, continued in his honor, offers an informal venue for scholars, graduate students, and other interested parties from the Atlanta area to discuss scholarly papers on topics concerning pre-modern European history and the relations between early modern Europe and the rest of the world.

== Principal publications ==
- The Making of a State: Württemberg, 1593–1793. Ithaca: Cornell University Press, 1984. OCLC 9894623
- The Old Reich: Essays on German Political Institutions, 1495–1806. Bruxelles: Editions de la librairie encyclopédique, 1974. OCLC 1717804 (as co-editor)
- The Swabian Kreis: Institutional Growth in the Holy Roman Empire, 1648–1715. Bruxelles [r. du Luxembourg 40]: Editions de la librairie encyclopédique, 1975. OCLC 2276157
