= Ludwig Wolff de la Marselle =

Austrian general (1747–1804)

- Born: 13 March 1747; Mons
- Died: 14 October 1804 (aged 57); Mons, present day Belgium
- Military career
- Allegiance: Habsburg Monarchy
- Branch: Colonel and Proprietor, 36th Infantry Regiment
- Service years: 1762–1799
- Rank: General-major
- Conflicts: Austro-Turkish War (1788–1791); War of the First Coalition; War of the Second Coalition
- Awards: Military Order of Maria Theresa

Ludwig Wolff de la Marselle or Ludwig Dominik Joseph Regis Wolff de la Marselle (13 March 1747 – 14 October 1804) was a general in Habsburg Austrian service in the French Revolutionary Wars. He was born and died in Mons, Austrian Netherlands (present-day Belgium).

== Military service ==
At the age of 14 he joined the Infantry as a Cadet; by age 23, he was an officer, in the 38th Infantry Regiment (L'Aisne). At the beginning of Austria's wars with Turkey, 1788, he was a major in the Gemmingen Infantry. In 1790 he served in Habsburg military to suppress the uprising in the Austrian Netherlands, with particularly distinguished service at the Battle of Falmagne, after which he was promoted to lieutenant colonel of the Clerfayt Infantry N. 9, a Walloon regiment. In 1794, he acquired command of the Grenadier Battalion Rousseau and fought with this regiment during the Rhine Campaign of 1795 in the Army of the Upper Rhine under command of Dagobert Sigmund von Wurmser. At the 1795 Siege of Mannheim he led his grenadiers in a special night foray on 10–11 November along the shore of the Neckar River, skirmishing with French troops; his regiment stormed both Schwetzingen and Heidelberg by bayonet. Wurmser commended the outstanding bravery of the grenadier battalion commander and attached the Wolff's battalion to the main army. In April 1796, Wolff was attached to the column of Archduke Charles by the Lahn river. (Note: There is some confusion in the sources regarding when his promotion to Lt. Colonel occurred, some stating it occurred in 1793 and some in 1796. Wurzach cites both promotions, and it is probable that the second promotion to Lt. Colonel was actually a promotion to colonel and simply an error in the 19th century biographical documents. Certainly by the end of 1798, he was a full colonel, and in command of the regiment Clerfayt.) On 19 June, he participated in the engagement by Uckerath, and defended the left wing of the retreat against the French army under Kléber. During the Coalition's withdrawal from the Upper Rhine, he led the smallest of the four Austrian columns (three battalions and four squadrons) along the length of Lake Constance’s northern shore, via Überlingen, Meersburg, Buchhorn, and the Austrian city of Bregenz.

=== Swiss and Italian campaigns of 1799 ===
In the campaign of 1799, Wolff participated in the battles at Ostrach and Stockach as part of the advance guard of Archduke Charles' army. In late May, he held a group reserve of over 3,000 troops in the Valtelline, on the Lombard border with Switzerland, where he supported Gottfried Strauch's suppression of the Cisalpine revolutionaries. (Note: Gottfried von Strauch, Freiherr, Feldzeugmeister and Inhaber of Galician Infantry Regiment Nr. 24 (appointed 1808), died in Vienna 18 March 1836. Militär-Schematismus des österreichischen Kaiserthums. Aus der k.k. Hof- und Staats-Druckerei., 1837 p.148, 513.) By June he was in northern Italy, with Konrad Valentin von Kaim's Turin division, where he commanded a mixed brigade of infantry, dragoons and grenadiers at the Alessandria garrison. Later that year he commanded a corps of the grenadiers Bellegarde in Switzerland, participating in the Swiss counter-revolution against the French in the Engadin valley. In 1800, he also participated in the Battle of Marengo, commanding the Archduke Josef Infantry Regiment (No. 63), again as part of Kaim's division.

He was colonel of the Clerfayt Regiment in 1798, although it is unclear when this promotion actually took place; in September 1799 he was promoted to major general and his promotion papers specifically referenced his leadership at Uckerrath. He received the Military Order of Maria Theresa on 18 August 1801. He retired from military service after 41 years in May 1801, and returned to his hometown of Mons, where he died in 1804, at the age of 58.

Military offices
Preceded by Count Clerfayt	Proprietor (Inhaber) (Note: Wolff was never confirmed in this position; according to most of the documentation, the position remained "open" until Czartoryski's appointment in 1804. However, Wolff was the colonel in command from 1798 (when Clerfayt died) until at least Wolff's retirement and Czartoryski was not confirmed as proprietor until after Wolff's death.) of Infantry Regiment N°9; 1798–1804	Succeeded by Adam Kazimierz Czartoryski
