= Battle of Kaiserslautern =

1793 battle during the War of the First Coalition

- Part of the French Revolution
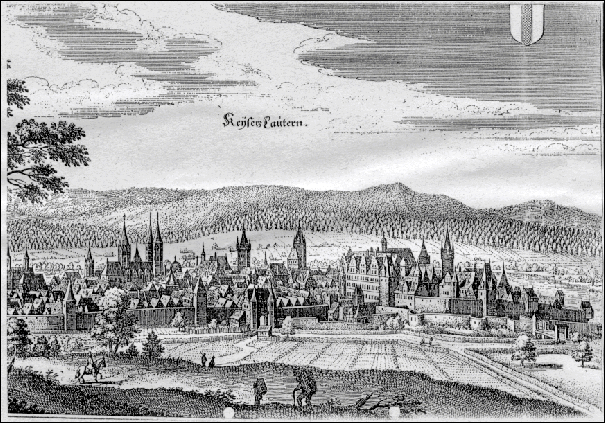
- Kaiserslautern, engraving after Merian
| Date | 28–30 November 1793 |
| Location | Kaiserslautern, present-day Germany 49°28′13″N 7°45′49″E |
| Result | Prussian–Saxon victory |

Belligerents
| Kingdom of Prussia (Electorate of Saxony) Electorate Saxony | (French First Republic) Republican France |

Commanders and leaders
| (Kingdom of Prussia) Duke of Brunswick | (French First Republic) Lazare Hoche |

Strength
| 26,000 | 36,000 |

Casualties and losses
| 806–1,300 | 2,000–3,100; 2 guns, 1 color |
- Location within Europe

The Battle of Kaiserslautern (28–30 November 1793) saw a Coalition army under Charles William Ferdinand, Duke of Brunswick-Wolfenbüttel oppose a Republican French army led by Lazare Hoche. Three days of conflict resulted in a victory by the Prussians and their Electoral Saxon allies as they turned back repeated French attacks. The War of the First Coalition combat was fought near the city of Kaiserslautern in the modern-day state of Rhineland-Palatinate, Germany, which is located about 60 kilometres (37 mi) west of Mannheim.

In the First Battle of Wissembourg, the Coalition army of Dagobert Sigmund von Wurmser broke through the frontier defenses and drove the French Army of the Rhine south to Strasbourg. In response to this crisis, the French government appointed Hoche to command the Army of the Moselle and Jean-Charles Pichegru to lead the Army of the Rhine, while urging them to relieve the siege of Landau. In November, Hoche launched an offensive which pressed back the Duke of Brunswick's army to Kaiserslautern. On 28 November, French troops moved on Brunswick's defenses from the north, northwest and west, but for two days the Coalition army fended off the piecemeal attacks of their adversaries. Hoche finally got his entire army into action on the 30th, but the professional Prussian soldiers proved more than a match for the enthusiastic but indifferently-trained French. After the setback, Hoche changed his strategy and turned a large part of his army against Wurmser's exposed western flank in Alsace. The next engagement was the Battle of Froeschwiller in December.

== Background ==
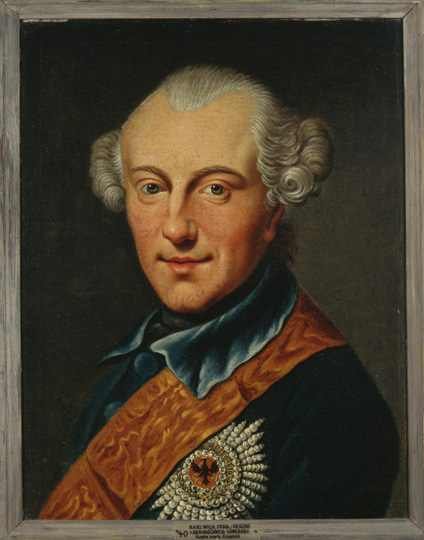
Duke of Brunswick

The 36,850-man Coalition army of Charles William Ferdinand, Duke of Brunswick successfully concluded the siege of Mainz on 23 July 1793. The French garrison of 18,675 men surrendered and was released on the promise of not fighting the Coalition for one year. The French government immediately sent the released troops to fight in the internal War in the Vendée. During the siege, the French suffered approximately 4,000 casualties while the Coalition lost about 3,000. The 60,000-strong Army of the Rhine under Alexandre de Beauharnais and the 40,000-strong Army of the Moselle under Jean Nicolas Houchard were poised to march to the relief of Mainz. However, Beauharnais had not informed the Mainz garrison that help was on the way and then took too long to start his movement. After the fall of Mainz, both French armies retreated, the Army of the Rhine to Wissembourg and the Army of the Moselle to the Saar River. Blamed for the loss of Mainz, Beauharnais fell into a funk, begged to be relieved of command and on 23 August 1793 he was replaced by Charles-Hyacinthe Le Clerc de Landremont. Meanwhile, Houchard had been replaced by Balthazar Alexis Henri Schauenburg on 5 August. Beauharnais was executed by guillotine on 23 July 1794. His widow Joséphine de Beauharnais later married Napoleon Bonaparte.

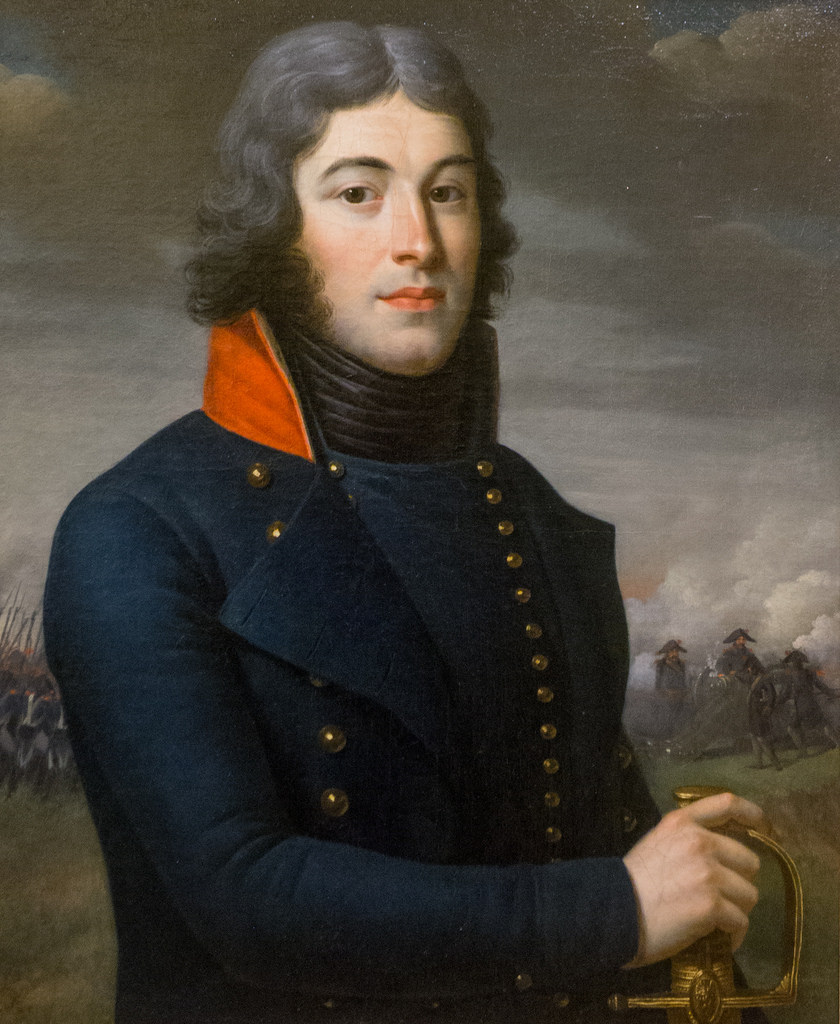
Lazare Hoche

Landremont was soon ordered to send 12,000 soldiers to the Army of the North. This reduced the strength of his field force to 45,000 with an additional 39,000 in garrisons or in the Upper Rhine Division under Jean-Charles Pichegru. Brunswick pressed forward toward the fortress of Bitche, driving back the Corps of the Vosges and the Army of the Moselle. At this moment, the French government dismissed Schauenburg for the crime of being an aristocrat. During his short tenure he had drilled the troops into better shape. The late commander of the Corps of the Vosges Jean René Moreaux was named to succeed him, but declined because an old wound had reopened. A division commander, Jacques Charles René Delauney reluctantly took over the army on 30 September. Landremont was also dismissed and arrested but his intended replacement, Antoine Guillaume Delmas was trapped in the siege of Landau. Pichegru was offered command of the Army of the Rhine but he refused. Since the generals saw that leading the army led to arrest or execution, none wanted to accept the command. Finally on 2 October, Jean Pascal Carlenc took command of the Army of the Rhine. He would quickly prove to be completely unfitted for the job.

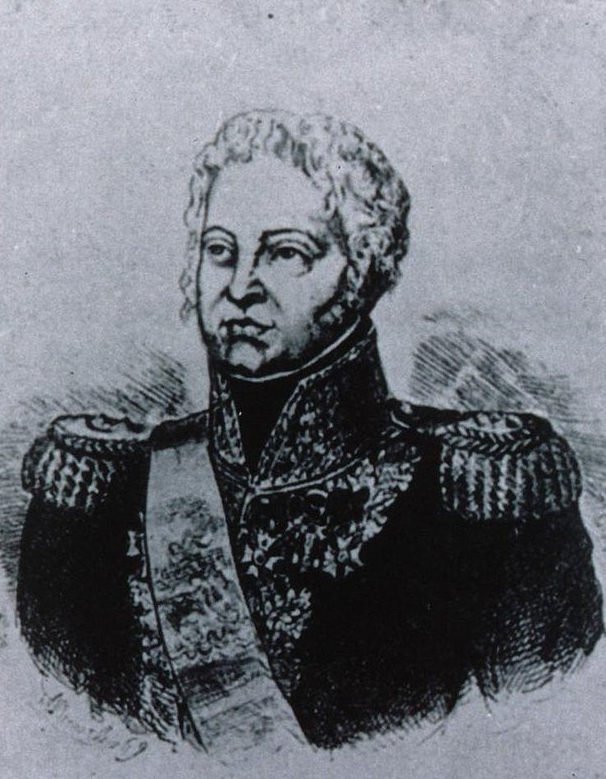
Alexis de Schauenburg

On 13 October 1793, a 43,185-man Coalition army led by Dagobert Sigmund von Wurmser defeated Carlenc's 34,400-strong army in the First Battle of Wissembourg. The government ordered Carlenc's arrest on the 23rd. The Army of the Rhine withdrew to the Zorn River near Strasbourg while Wurmser's army occupied northern Alsace. On 22 October, Delauney sent six battalions to Saverne where they helped repel an attack by one of Wurmser's divisions. Pichegru took command of the Army of the Rhine on 29 October. That same day Delaunay was dismissed from command of the Army of the Moselle. The representatives on mission wanted Eustache Charles d'Aoust to replace Delauney but Lazare Hoche arrived from Paris to take command on 31 October. His rank was general of division rather than army commander because he was supposed to act under the orders of Pichegru. On 18 November, Pichegru began a series of attacks on Wurmser's defensive lines in the Battle of Haguenau.

The French government reinforced the Army of the Moselle with 15,000 troops taken from the Army of the Rhine and 5,000 from the Army of the Ardennes. Both Hoche and Pichegru were well aware that the main objective was the relief of Landau. In mid-November 1793, Hoche advanced from the Saar with 36,000 troops while the rest of the army guarded the passes through the Vosges. Hoche used rough language with his subordinates; at this time he wrote one of his division commanders Jean-Jacques Ambert, "Listen, bugger of a sans-culotte...". On 17 November, a Prussian raid on the fort at Bitche failed. Leopold Alexander von Wartensleben's column of 1,200 picked soldiers overran the outer defenses with the help of a French traitor. However, they were soon discovered and repulsed with casualties of 120 killed and 251 captured. The French lost 63 men captured and few other losses. The same day, the French divisions of Alexandre Camille Taponier and Louis Pierre Huet bumped into 13,000 Prussians under Friedrich Adolf, Count von Kalckreuth at Biesingen, north of Mandelbachtal. The 20,000 French troops were drubbed, losing 760 men killed or wounded and 42 captured against a Prussian loss of only 16 killed and 92 wounded.

Despite the setback at Biesingen, Brunswick's troops were pulling back into winter quarters and Hoche entered Blieskastel on 18 November. The Prussians abandoned the camp of Hornbach and the French occupied it on the 19th. Believing that he had his enemies on the run, Hoche became very optimistic. Alarmed at the French offensive and anxious that they intended to relieve Landau by moving via Pirmasens, Brunswick made up his mind to offer battle at Kaiserslautern. In fact, Hoche hoped to raise the siege of Landau by striking east from Zweibrücken (Deux-Ponts) and then down the Queich River. Meanwhile, Hoche completely lost track of his enemies. From Zweibrücken he launched his army toward Pirmasens on the 24th only to have to march back to his starting point the next day when he did not find Brunswick. Finally, the French started northeast for Kaiserslautern in three columns. On the left, Ambert moved through Neunkirchen am Potzberg and Reichenbach-Steegen toward Otterberg, north of Kaiserslautern. On the right, Taponier marched directly on Kaiserslautern via Landstuhl, with instructions to seize the Hoheneck heights. Hoche with the main body advanced through Schönenberg-Kübelberg toward Rodenbach. Rémy Vincent was posted in Pirmasens to watch the Prussians and to shield the army's movement.

== Battle ==
=== Forces ===
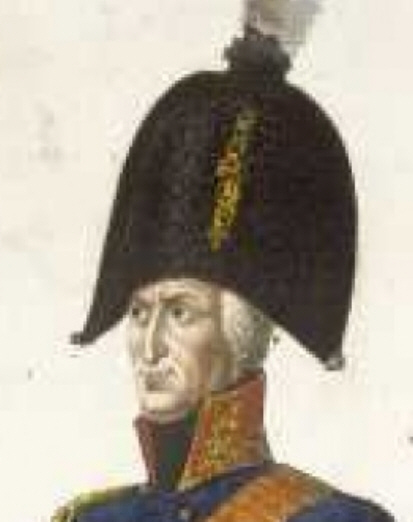
Friedrich Kalckreuth

The Duke of Brunswick's army consisted of 35¾ battalions, 54 squadrons and 10 artillery batteries, a total of 26,000 Prussians, Saxons and allies. There were three Prussian divisions led by General-Leutnants Ludwig Karl von Kalckstein, Nikolaus Heinrich von Schönfeld and Friedrich Adolf, Count von Kalckreuth, one Saxon division, an Advanced Guard led by Colonel Szekely and a Guards brigade under General-major Friedrich Adrian von Roeder. All units are Prussian unless otherwise noted. The Advance Guard included five squadrons of the Combined Cavalry Regiment, two squadrons of the Saxon Hussar Regiment, the 2nd Battalion of the Vietinghof Infantry Regiment Nr. 38 and two field pieces. Roeder's Guards brigade consisted of two battalions of the Garde Infantry Regiment Nr. 15 and the 1st Battalion of the Grenadier-Garde Nr. 6. The Saxon Division comprised one battalion each of the Infantry Regiments Kurfürst, Prinz Anton, Clemens and Gotha and five squadrons each of the Carabinier, Leib Cuirassier and Kurland Chevau-léger Regiments.

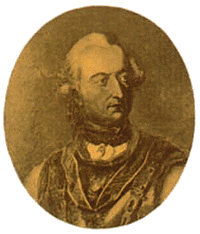
Nikolaus Schönfeld

Kalckstein's division consisted of three battalions each of the Infantry Regiments Brunswick-Wolfenbüttel Nr. 19 and Prinz Heinrich Nr. 35. Schönfeld's division included three battalions of Infantry Regiment Crousaz Nr. 39, Fusilier Battalion Legat Nr. 20, one company of Jägers, one company of Imperial Trier Jägers, five squadrons each of the Borstell Cuirassiers Nr. 7 and Lottum Dragoons Nr. 1, two squadrons of the Eben Hussars Nr. 2, and one foot and one horse artillery batteries of eight guns each. Kalckreuth's division counted three battalions each of Infantry Regiments Kalckstein Nr. 5, Duke of Brunswick Nr. 21 and Knobelsdorff Nr. 27, two battalions of Vietinghof Nr. 38, the 2nd Battalions of the Garde Nr. 15 and Grenadier-Garde Nr. 6, and five squadrons of the Voss Dragoons Nr. 11. The army artillery train was made up of 26 6-pound cannons in four foot batteries, eight 12-pound cannons in one foot battery and one battery of eight mortars.

Lazare Hoche's Army of the Moselle numbered 29,115 infantry, 5,046 cavalry and 52 field guns. These were organized into an Advance Guard under General of Brigade Paul-Alexis Dubois and divisions under Generals of Division Ambert, Huet, Taponier and Vincent. In the list that follows, the numbered units are regulars while the italicized units are National Guard volunteer battalions and free companies. The Advance Guard included one company of the 89th Line Infantry, the Gérard, Guillaume, Louvre and Metz Free Companies, four squadrons each of the 1st Carabinier and 1st Dragoon Regiments, three squadrons of the 3rd Hussars, one squadron of the 7th Hussars, a half squadron each of the Jemappes Hussars and the 6th and 16th Chasseurs à Cheval and 12 guns in two horse artillery batteries.

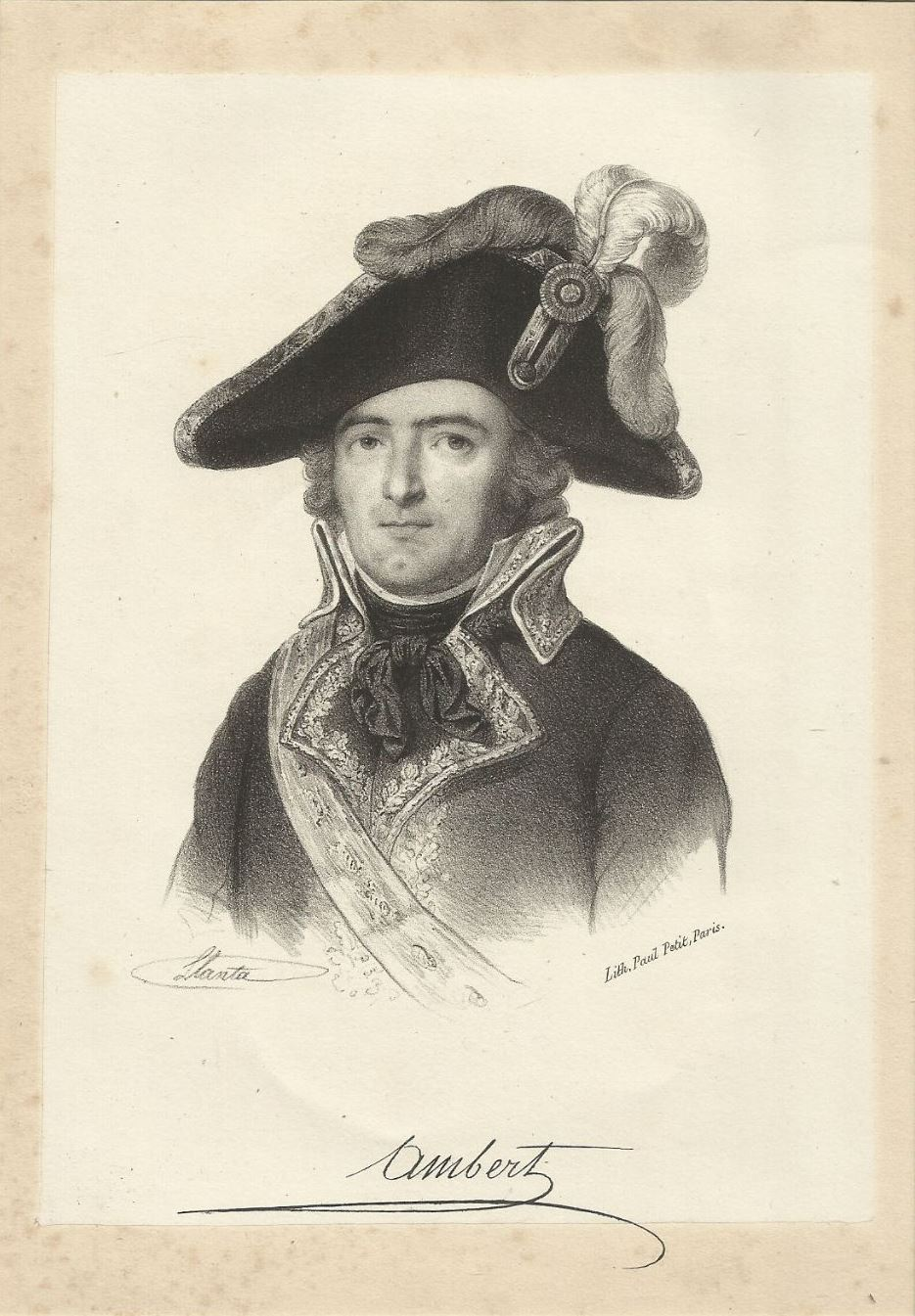
Jean-Jacques Ambert

Ambert's division was organized into brigades under Jean-Baptiste Olivier, Henri Simon and Joinville. Olivier led one battalion of the 13th Line Infantry, one battalion and four squadrons of the Moselle Legion, four squadrons of the 2nd Carabinier Regiment and six guns in one horse artillery battery. Simon commanded the 1st Battalion of the 30th Line, the 2nd Battalion of the 55th Line, the 3rd Battalion of the République, the 4th Battalions of the Haute-Saône and Meurthe and the 5th Battalion of the Orne. The Joinville brigade comprised the 2nd Battalion of the 99th Line and one battalion of the Joinville. Huet's division was divided into brigades led by Antoine Morlot and Nicolas Augustin Paillard. Morlot directed the 1st Battalions of the 44th and 81st Line, the 2nd Battalion of the 71st Line, the 1st Battalion of the Ardennes, the 2nd Battalion of the Haute-Marne, the 6th Battalion of the Meurthe and 16 guns in two foot artillery batteries. Paillard commanded the 1st Battalions of the 103rd Line and Rhône-et-Loire, 2nd Battalions of the 58th Line and Seine-et-Marne, the 6th Battalion of the Vosges, the 7th Battalion of the Meurthe and a half-company of sappers. Huet's advance guard consisted of one company of the 96th Line, the Billard, Maurice and Observatory Free Companies and four squadrons each of the 4th Cavalry and 9th Chasseurs à Cheval Regiments.

Taponier's division had a brigade under Antoine de Sagne Lombard and an advance guard. Lombard directed the 1st Battalion of the 1st Line, the 2nd Battalions of the 8th and 54th Line, the 3rd Battalion of the Manche, 7th Battalion of the Rhône-et-Loire, a half company of sappers and eight guns in one foot artillery battery. Taponier's advance guard was made up of the 3rd Louvre, 4th Louvre, Bons Tireurs and Jemappes Free Companies, four squadrons each of the 10th Cavalry and 14th Dragoon Regiments and eight guns in one foot artillery battery. Vincent's division had the 1st Battalions of the 5th Line, Lot, République and Rhône-et-Loire, 2nd Battalion of the 17th Line, 4th Battalion of the Moselle, a half company of sappers and eight guns in one foot artillery battery. Vincent's advance guard included one battalion of the Chasseurs de Rheims, five squadrons each of the 1st Chasseurs à Cheval and Gendarmerie Regiments and six guns in one horse artillery battery.

=== First day ===
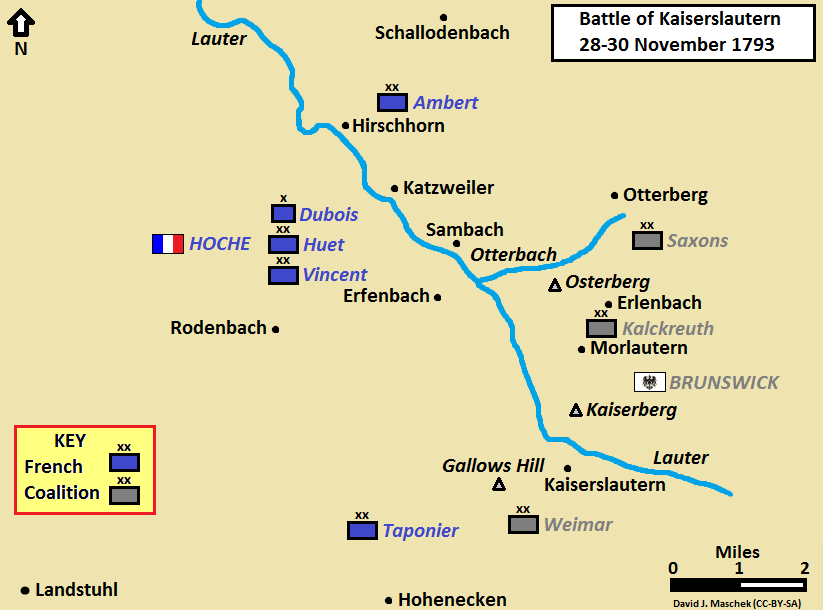
Map of the Battle of Kaiserslautern, 28–30 November 1793.

Brunswick's army was deployed with its right flank resting on the city of Kaiserslautern and its flank covered by the marshy banks of the Lauter River. Just to the north, a regiment was stationed on the castle hill at Otterberg in order to maintain a link with Ernst Christian von Kospoth's division at Lauterecken well to the north. Another division was posted at Trippstadt to the south. The Trippstadt force maintained communications with Frederick Louis, Prince of Hohenlohe-Ingelfingen's corps near Pirmasens. Hohenlohe blocked the eastward routes to Landau via Neustadt an der Weinstrasse and Annweiler am Trifels. Another Prussian corps under Wilhelm René de l'Homme de Courbière operated in the Rhine valley, supporting Wurmser's army and covering the passes in the Vosges. Finally, a brigade under Leopold Heinrich von der Goltz guarded the Pigeonnier height west of Wissembourg. Military theorist Antoine-Henri Jomini commented that Brunswick ought to have massed all these forces against Hoche. He also faulted Hoche for attacking in three separated columns.

On 28 November the French army advanced in three columns against the Prussian position. with Taponier leading the right, Hoche the center and Ambert the left. Taponier moved against the village of Vogelweh while Ambert aimed to cross the Lauter at Hirschhorn. Taponier's column was the first to encounter the Prussians and to open the battle, meeting moderate success. The initial attack carried his troops onto the outer ridge of the Hoheneck heights. Taponier also came up against the Galgenberg (Gallows Hill) which was defended by a Prussian redoubt. Alarmed at the march of Ambert's column, Brunswick reacted by sending Kalckreuth north to block it. Kalckreuth's force took a new position with his left flank on the Lauter, his center at Morlautern and his right near Erlenbach. Another division was placed on the Kaiserberg, while Duke Karl August of Saxe-Weimar was left to defend the western approaches to Kaiserslautern.

After leaving Rodenbach, Hoche's column encountered impassable roads in the Voog Forest and had to detour around the obstacle. His troops stayed on the west bank of the Lauter and never got into action on the 28th. By strenuous efforts, Ambert crossed the Lauter and moved south through Katzweiler and Sambach. He gamely attacked across the Otterbach stream several times but his 6,000 men were outnumbered by Kalckreuth. Menaced with encirclement, Ambert retreated and came in close proximity to Hoche's center column near Sambach. Despite the lack of success, Hoche determined to deliver the main attack from his left wing the next day. Accordingly, he made preparations to cross the Sambach bridge to join Ambert.

=== Second day ===
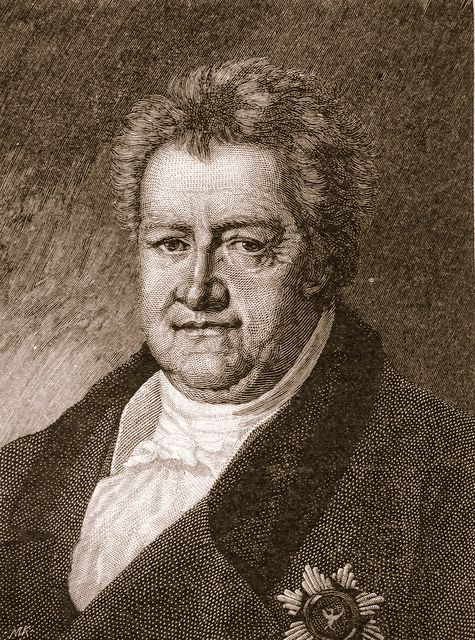
Duke of Saxe-Weimar

The next day the French army crossed the river in force. On the 29th, Dubois' advance guard crossed first and joined a brigade under Olivier in a costly attack on the Prussian entrenchments. Meanwhile, Hoche established a 16-gun battery near Sambach and a second battery near Erfenbach on the west bank. Ambert led the brigades of Simon and Paillard far to the left to turn the Prussian position at Otterberg. Huet moved against the enemy position with Morlot's brigade. Under the crossfire of the Sambach and Erfenbach batteries, the Prussians fell back and the French crossed the Otterbach.

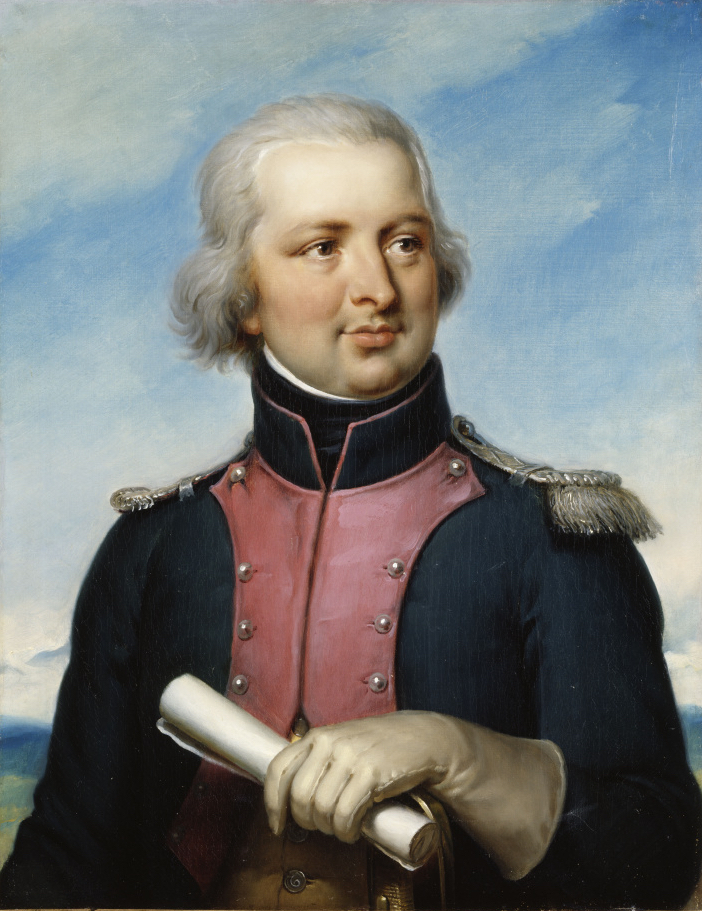
Hédouville

Hoche set up a 29-gun battery on the Osterberg height, starting a mutual bombardment that went on for a few hours. The French general then hurled a column of 10,000 troops at the Prussian left flank. This part of Kalckreuth's position between the Lauter and Morlautern was separated from the rest of his line by a ravine. Two regiments of Saxon cavalry charged Huet's division in the left flank. Hoche's chief of staff Gabriel Marie Joseph, comte d'Hédouville brought up some French cavalry squadrons from the Osterberg and hit the Saxons in their right flank. More horsemen from both sides joined the melee and ultimately the Saxons prevailed. Shaken by the cavalry charge, the French infantry withdrew to the Otterbach valley. The French attacks on Erlenbach also failed and by 6:00 PM the fusillade died down.

On the left flank, Simon's brigade got lost and was unable to join Paillard's brigade at the old Otterberg glassworks until that evening. By then it was too late to mount an attack, so the 29th was Ambert's day to miss the action. Ambert had to march all night to rejoin the French main force. Unknown to the French, Kospoth's division marched south from Lauterecken to Schallodenbach, from which the Prussian could attack Ambert in the rear. So it was lucky that the French left wing shifted position. On the right flank Taponier assaulted the Galgenberg but was unable to make any headway. The Prussian left wing was supported by artillery fire from the Kaiserberg. Brunswick directed Wartensleben at Trippstadt to march to Kaiserslautern with three battalions and 10 squadrons. During the day, Wartensleben's troops reinforced the Duke of Saxe-Weimar's position on the Galgenberg and helped drive Taponier's men back into the woods.

=== Third day ===
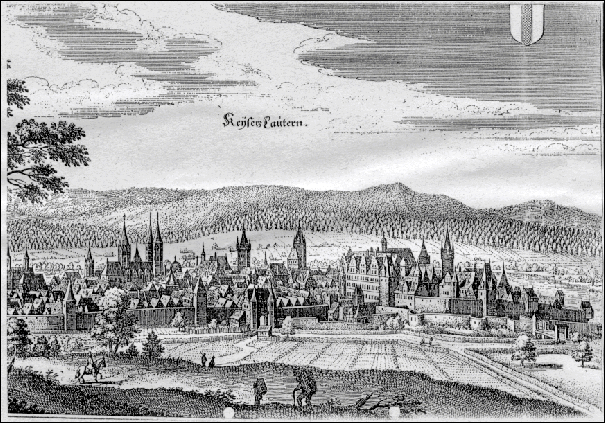
Kaiserslautern in 1645

Hoche persisted in his attacks on 30 November. At dawn, he directed his artillery to open a new barrage on the Prussian positions. On the left flank, leading four battalions against the Buchberg near Erlenbach, Gabriel Jean Joseph Molitor failed to capture the position and was repulsed after a sanguinary fight with the Saxons. The appearance of Kospoth's troops near Otterberg in his rear compelled Molitor to make a rapid retreat. The French assaulted the Galapfelberg height but this effort was also defeated. This feature is located north of the Kaiserberg. While holding the woods in the center, the division of Huet had difficulty maintaining its position, suffering under a storm of grapeshot. The cavalry of both armies was very active; the fighting took the form of charges and counter-charges of the French and Saxo-Prussian cavalry. On the French right, Taponier made two more assaults on the Galgenberg, but Saxe-Weimar drove them off.

After having secured his flanks, the Duke of Brunswick launched a counterattack against the Osterberg. Seeing his left wing outflanked by the Saxons near Erlenbach, Hoche ordered a retreat. He detailed Ambert and five battalions to cover the withdrawal from the Mayberg height while the army filed to the west bank across the Sambach bridge and another span built near the Lamperts mill. Hoche's exhausted troops retreated to Zweibrücken, Hornbach and Pirmasens. Following the passive strategy of his sovereign, King Frederick William II, Brunswick did not launch a pursuit.

== Aftermath ==
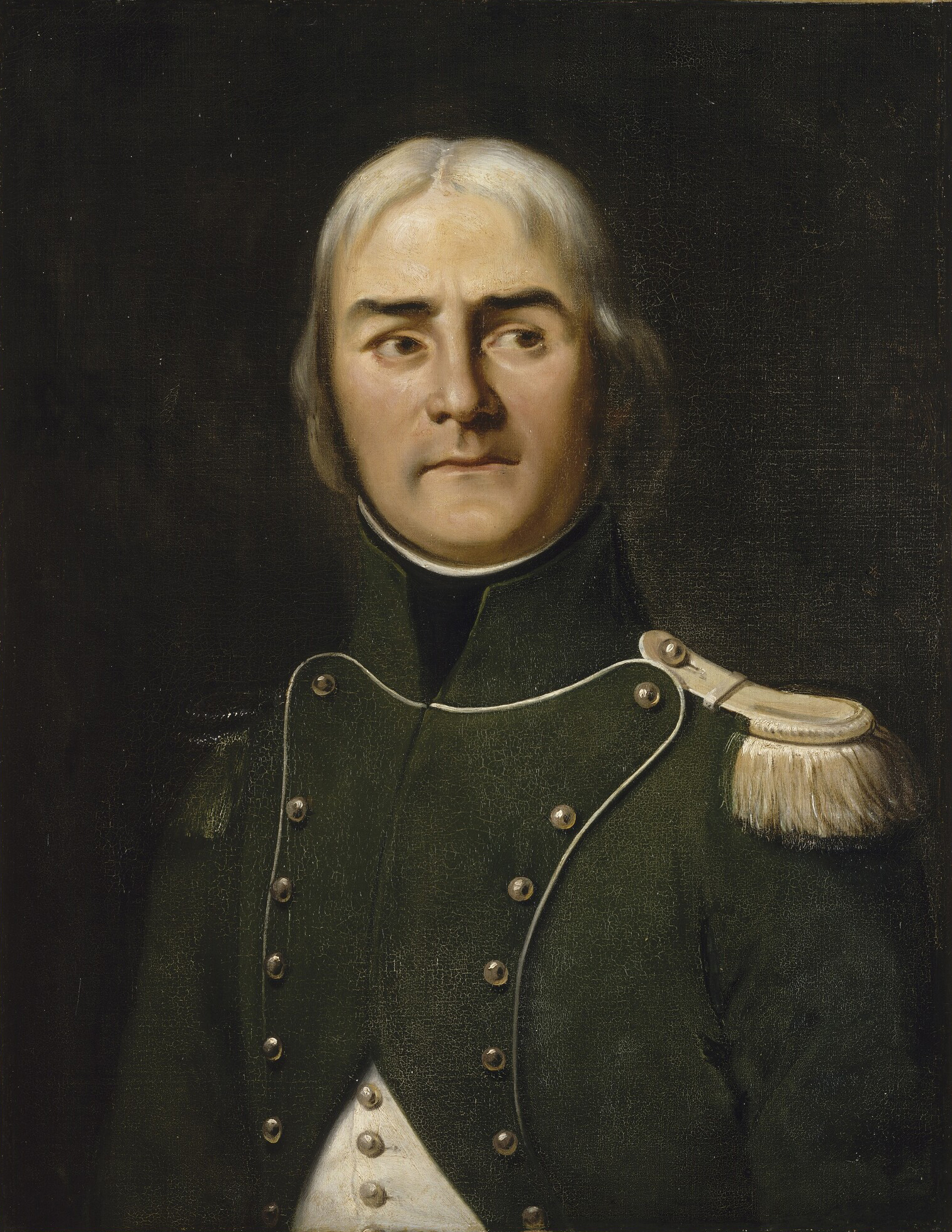
François Lefebvre

Jomini estimated that the French suffered 3,000 casualties while the Saxo-Prussians lost 1,300. A second authority asserted that the French lost 1,300 killed and wounded plus an additional 700 men, two guns and one color captured, adding that Brunswick's army sustained losses of 44 officers and 785 soldiers killed and wounded, a total of 829. A third source listed French losses as 2,400 killed and wounded with 700 men, two guns and one color captured, while the Prussians lost 32 officers and 584 men and the Saxons lost 12 officers and 178 men, a total of 806.

The representatives on mission were angry at Hoche and threatened to denounce him. He sarcastically told them to write an order declaring victory, then he went on, "Do not disturb yourselves, I have other means". Fortunately for him, Hoche remained in favor with the Committee of Public Safety and was not arrested and executed like Custine and Houchard. Maximilien Robespierre declared that Hoche's behavior showed that he was a true sans-culotte and another 10,000 reinforcements were sent him from the Army of the Ardennes. However, Hédouville who Hoche had kept as chief of staff for the battle was arrested as a nobleman. François Joseph Lefebvre was promoted to general of brigade for excellent work, as was Édouard Huet for repelling the Prussian assault at Bitche. Louis Huet had shown himself incompetent and was shelved.

Brunswick seemed baffled by Hoche's clumsy attack on his army. In his subsequent actions the Prussian failed to fully cooperate with his colleague Wurmser. Despite its defeat, the morale of the Army of the Moselle was unaffected. The French soldiers remained sure of themselves, perhaps because of their capture of enemy-held territory before the battle. Hoche fortified Pirmasens and Blieskastel and mounted a false attack against Brunswick. But this was a smokescreen to cover his real intentions which were to shift his strength against Wurmser's western flank. Already on 23 November, Philippe-Joseph Jacob's division was moved to Niederbronn-les-Bains. This was joined by Taponier's division on 5 December and Jean Grangeret's division a week later. On 22 December 1793, Hoche defeated Wurmser in the Battle of Froeschwiller.

== Notes ==
| Preceded by French expedition to Sardinia | French Revolution: Revolutionary campaigns Battle of Kaiserslautern | Succeeded by Siege of Mainz (1793) |
