= Château de Frœschwiller =

French château in Bas-Rhin

Coordinates: 48°56′33″N 7°43′16″E

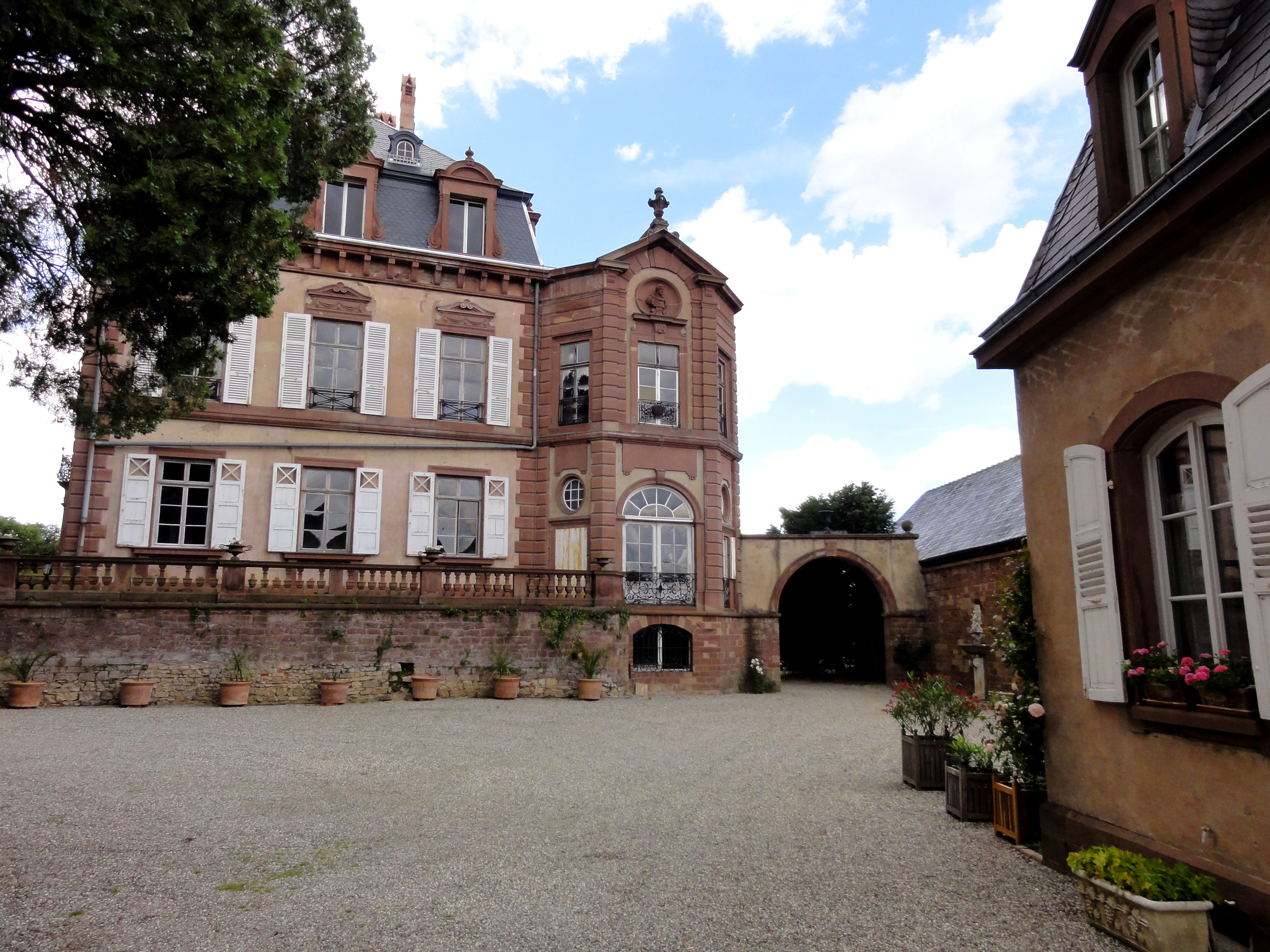
Château de Frœschwiller

Château de Frœschwiller is a château in the commune of Frœschwiller, in the department of Bas-Rhin, Alsace, France. Built in 1890, it became a Monument historique in 2009.
