= Battle of Ettlingen =

Battle of the French Revolutionary Wars

Coordinates: 48°56′36″N 8°24′33″E

- Part of the French Revolutionary War
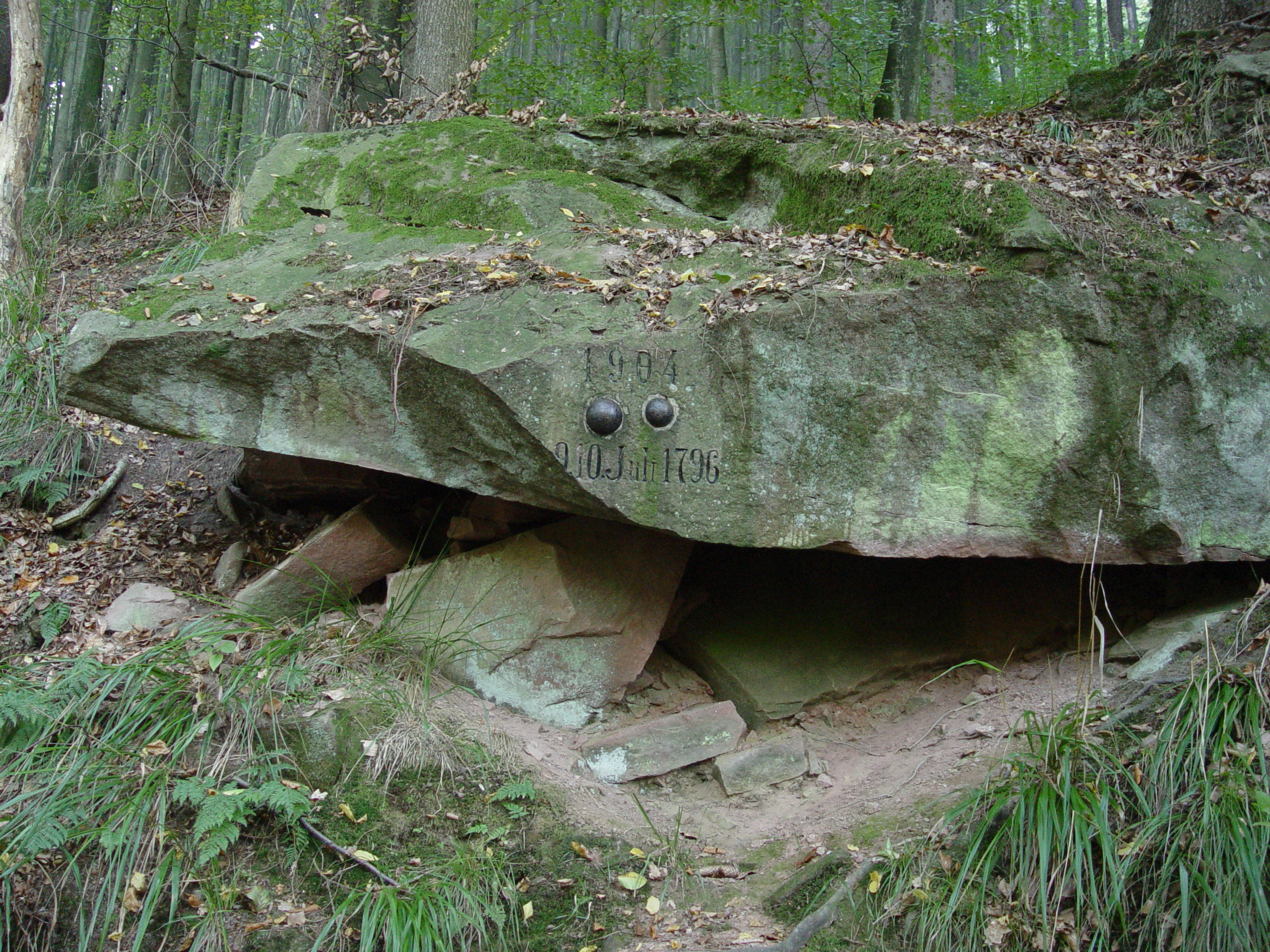
- Two cannonballs embedded in a large boulder have the date 9.10.Juli.1796 inscribed in the stone.
Date	9 July 1796
Location	Ettlingen, Baden-Württemberg, present-day Germany
Result	French victory

Belligerents
(France) French Republic	(Habsburg monarchy) Habsburg Austria (Electorate of Saxony) Electoral Saxony

Commanders and leaders
(France) Jean Moreau	(Habsburg monarchy) Archduke Charles

Units involved
Army of Rhin-et-Moselle	Army of the Upper Rhine

Strength
36,000	32,000

Casualties and losses
2,400	2,600

The Battle of Ettlingen or Battle of Malsch (9 July 1796) was fought during the French Revolutionary Wars between the armies of the First French Republic and Habsburg Austria near the town of Malsch, 9 kilometres (6 mi) southwest of Ettlingen. The Austrians under Archduke Charles, Duke of Teschen tried to halt the northward advance of Jean Victor Marie Moreau's French Army of Rhin-et-Moselle along the east bank of the Rhine River. After a tough fight, the Austrian commander found that his left flank was turned. He conceded victory to the French and retreated east toward Stuttgart. Ettlingen is located 10 kilometres (6 mi) south of Karlsruhe.

The Rhine Campaign of 1796 saw Moreau's army facing the Austrian Army of the Upper Rhine under Maximilian Anton Karl, Count Baillet de Latour in the south. Meanwhile, Jean-Baptiste Jourdan's French Army of Sambre-et-Meuse opposed the Army of the Lower Rhine under Archduke Charles in the north. Jourdan drubbed Duke Ferdinand Frederick Augustus of Württemberg at Altenkirchen on 4 June, compelling Archduke Charles to rush to the rescue with reinforcements. Charles defeated Jourdan at Wetzlar on the 15th, forcing him to pull back to the west bank of the Rhine. At this time there was a shake up in the high command and the archduke was put in control of both Austrian armies. In Charles' absence, Moreau successfully crossed the Rhine at Kehl on the night of 23–24 June and beat Latour at Rastatt on 5 July. Leaving Wilhelm von Wartensleben in charge in the north, Charles rushed south to confront Moreau along the Alb River near Ettlingen. After an all-day combat, the Austrians held the advantage on their right wing near Malsch, but the French had defeated their left wing in the Black Forest.

== Background ==
=== Plans ===
At the beginning of the Rhine Campaign of 1796, Austria had two armies in Germany, the Army of the Upper Rhine under Dagobert Sigmund von Wurmser and the Army of the Lower Rhine under Archduke Charles, Duke of Teschen. The left wing of the 80,000-man Army of the Upper Rhine guarded the Rhine River from Mannheim to Switzerland under Anton Sztáray, Michael von Fröhlich and Louis Joseph, Prince of Condé while its right wing was on the west bank around Kaiserslautern. The Army of the Lower Rhine had a 20,000-strong right wing under Duke Ferdinand Frederick Augustus of Württemberg on the east bank observing the French bridgehead at Düsseldorf. The archduke's remaining 70,000 troops lay on the west bank along the Nahe River with powerful garrisons in Mainz and Ehrenbreitstein Fortress.

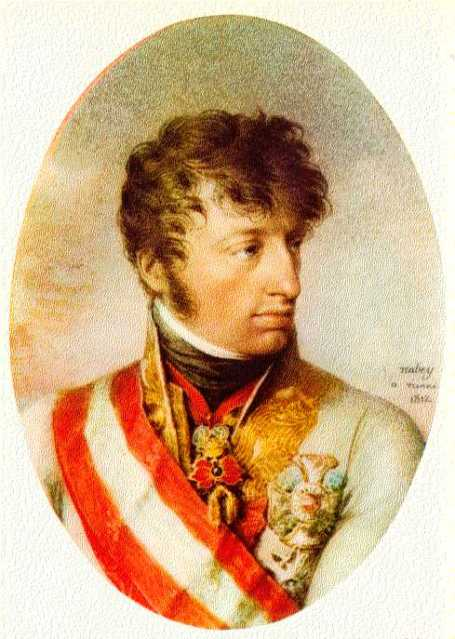
Archduke Charles

The Army of Rhin-et-Moselle led by Jean Victor Marie Moreau was deployed with its right flank at Huningue, its center on the Queich River and its left flank at Saarbrücken. The Army of Sambre-et-Meuse commanded by Jean-Baptiste Jourdan was responsible for a line running north from Sankt Wendel to Cologne, while the 22,000 men of its left wing under Jean-Baptiste Kléber held Düsseldorf. The French grand strategy designed by Minister of War Lazare Carnot was for each of their two armies to turn the Austrian flanks. The strategic plan called for Jourdan to start by advancing by his left wing and was designed to accomplish two goals. First, it was hoped that this would cause the Austrians to abandon the west bank of the Rhine. Second, the move would draw Austrian strength north and allow Moreau's army a better chance to cross the Rhine in the south.

Until this time, the Army of Rhine-et-Moselle consisted of independent divisions. When Moreau assumed command he reorganized the army into three corps or wings plus a small reserve. Over the objections of all three men, he named Louis Desaix, Laurent Gouvion Saint-Cyr and Pierre Marie Barthélemy Ferino wing commanders. The system soon proved its worth. Moreau's other innovation was to group many of the heavy cavalry regiments in the army reserve. The Chasseurs à Cheval, Dragoon and Hussar regiments remained attached to the infantry divisions. On 8 June, Ferino's Right Wing had three divisions led by François Antoine Louis Bourcier (9,281 infantry, 690 cavalry), Henri François Delaborde (8,300 infantry, 174 cavalry) and Augustin Tuncq (7,437 infantry, 432 cavalry). Desaix's Center had three divisions commanded by Michel de Beaupuy (14,565 infantry, 1,266 cavalry), Antoine Guillaume Delmas (7,898 infantry, 865 cavalry) and Charles Antoine Xaintrailles (4,828 infantry, 962 cavalry). Saint-Cyr's Left Wing had two divisions under Guillaume Philibert Duhesme (7,438 infantry, 895 cavalry) and Alexandre Camille Taponier (11,823 infantry, 1,231 cavalry). Altogether, Moreau's Army of Rhin-et-Moselle numbered 71,581 foot soldiers and 6,515 cavalry, plus gunners and sappers. Counting artillery and other elements, Moreau's total was 79,592 soldiers while Jourdan commanded 77,792 men.

=== Operations ===
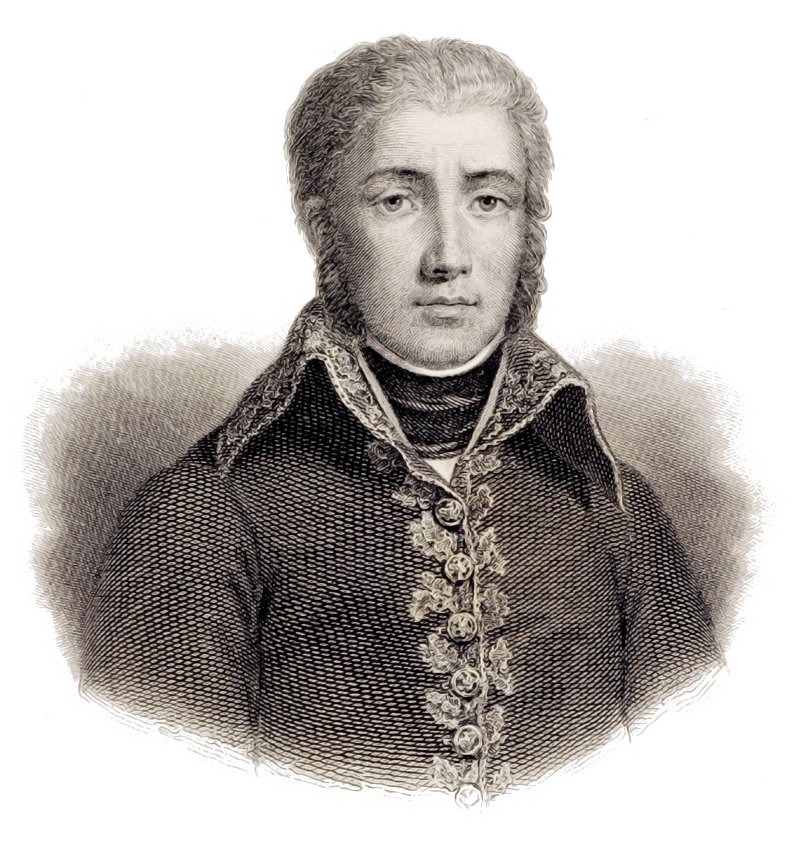
Jean Victor Moreau

The Rhine Campaign of 1795 had concluded with an armistice. On 20 May 1796, the Austrians notified the French that the truce would end on 1 June. The minute it expired, Kléber led two divisions across the armistice line heading south toward Charles' right wing. The French beat the Duke of Württemberg in the Battle of Altenkirchen on 4 June, capturing 3,000 Austrians, four colors and 12 guns. By 6 June Kléber's wing was on the Lahn River and Archduke Charles began evacuating the west bank of the Rhine in order to concentrate against the French incursion. Kléber was joined within a few days by Jourdan and most of the Army of the Sambre-et-Meuse. At about this time, the Austrian high command began transferring Wurmser and 25,000 Austrians to Italy due to the successes of Napoleon Bonaparte. On 15 June, the archduke defeated the French in the Battle of Wetzlar. Subsequently, Jourdan recrossed to the west bank of the Rhine while Kléber retreated north toward Düsseldorf.

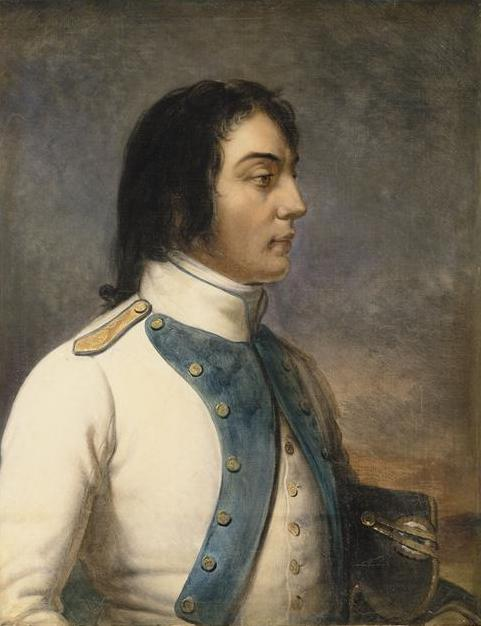
Louis Desaix in 1792

With Wurmser leaving the theater, Archduke Charles was given command over both Austrian armies. Wilhelm von Wartensleben took command of the Army of the Lower Rhine while Maximilian Anton Karl, Count Baillet de Latour assumed leadership of the Army of the Upper Rhine. Jourdan and Kléber's advance had caused their opponents to abandon the west bank of the Rhine and had drawn Charles north, as planned. Meanwhile, Moreau mounted operations against the Austrian fortifications opposite Mannheim in order to lead his enemies into thinking that it was the main attack. But on 24 June 1796, Moreau launched a successful river crossing in the Battle of Kehl. The 7,000 defending troops of the Swabian Regional Contingent put up a stout fight but were defeated with the loss of 700 soldiers, 14 guns and 22 munition wagons. The French reported losses of 150. Subsequently, Sztáray took command of the Swabians who were reinforced up to a strength of 9,000 by some Austrians. On the 28th Sztáray was beaten by Desaix at Renchen. The French sustained 200 casualties while allied losses amounted to 550 killed and wounded plus 850 men, seven guns and two munition wagons captured.

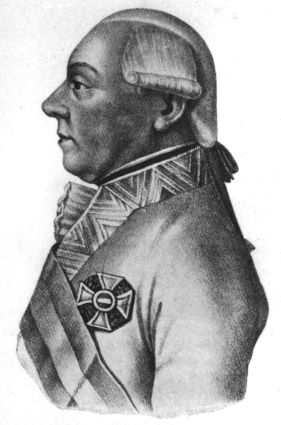
Count Baillet de Latour

Having blocked Jourdan, Archduke Charles began moving troops south to oppose the Army of Rhin-et-Moselle as early as 21 June. He received the news that Moreau was across the Rhine on the 26th. Leaving 25,351-foot and 10,933 horse under Wartensleben and 27,000 more around Mainz, the archduke raced south. The last units of the Moreau's army made it across the Rhine on 29 June, though Delaborde remained guarding the west bank of the Rhine for a time. For a few days the French enjoyed a numerical superiority of 30,000 to 18,000 over their opponents. Moreau then made the remarkable decision to switch the positions of two of his wings; Desaix now led the Left Wing while Saint-Cyr commanded the center. He also reorganized his army, reassigning some regiments that got lost in the confusion of the river crossing. Army of Rhin-et-Moselle expanded its bridgehead in a semicircle. Desaix moved downstream (north), Ferino moved upstream (south) and Saint-Cyr operated in the hills, ready to support either wing. The French irruption caused Fröhlich and Condé to retreat up the Rhine and Kinzig Rivers while Sztáray and the Swabians fell back to Freudenstadt.

Moreau had an opportunity to smash one of the enemy forces, but he moved slowly. Saint-Cyr started from Oberkirch on 2 July. The next day his wing moved in an easterly direction, seizing enemy positions at Oppenau, on the Kniebis Mountain and at Freudenstadt. This deep thrust completely separated Fröhlich from the rest of the Army of the Upper Rhine. Latour and Sztáray tried to hold a position behind the Murg River but Desaix attacked them in the Battle of Rastatt on 5 July. To assist in this operation, Moreau directed Saint-Cyr to move down the Murg valley. On the same day as Rastatt, Taponier's division captured Gernsbach. At Rastatt, the French employed 19,000 infantry and 1,500 cavalry to spar with 6,000 Austrians led by Karl Aloys zu Fürstenberg and Johann Mészáros von Szoboszló. The French turned both Austrian flanks, forcing their enemies to pull back east toward Ettlingen. Casualties on both sides were light. The Austrians lost 200 men and three guns captured. At Ettlingen Latour found the archduke's leading elements, with the main body still a few days distant. The Austrians were in a vulnerable situation but Moreau delayed for three days at Rastatt, allowing Charles to bring up 25 battalions and 39 squadrons.

== Battle ==
=== French army ===
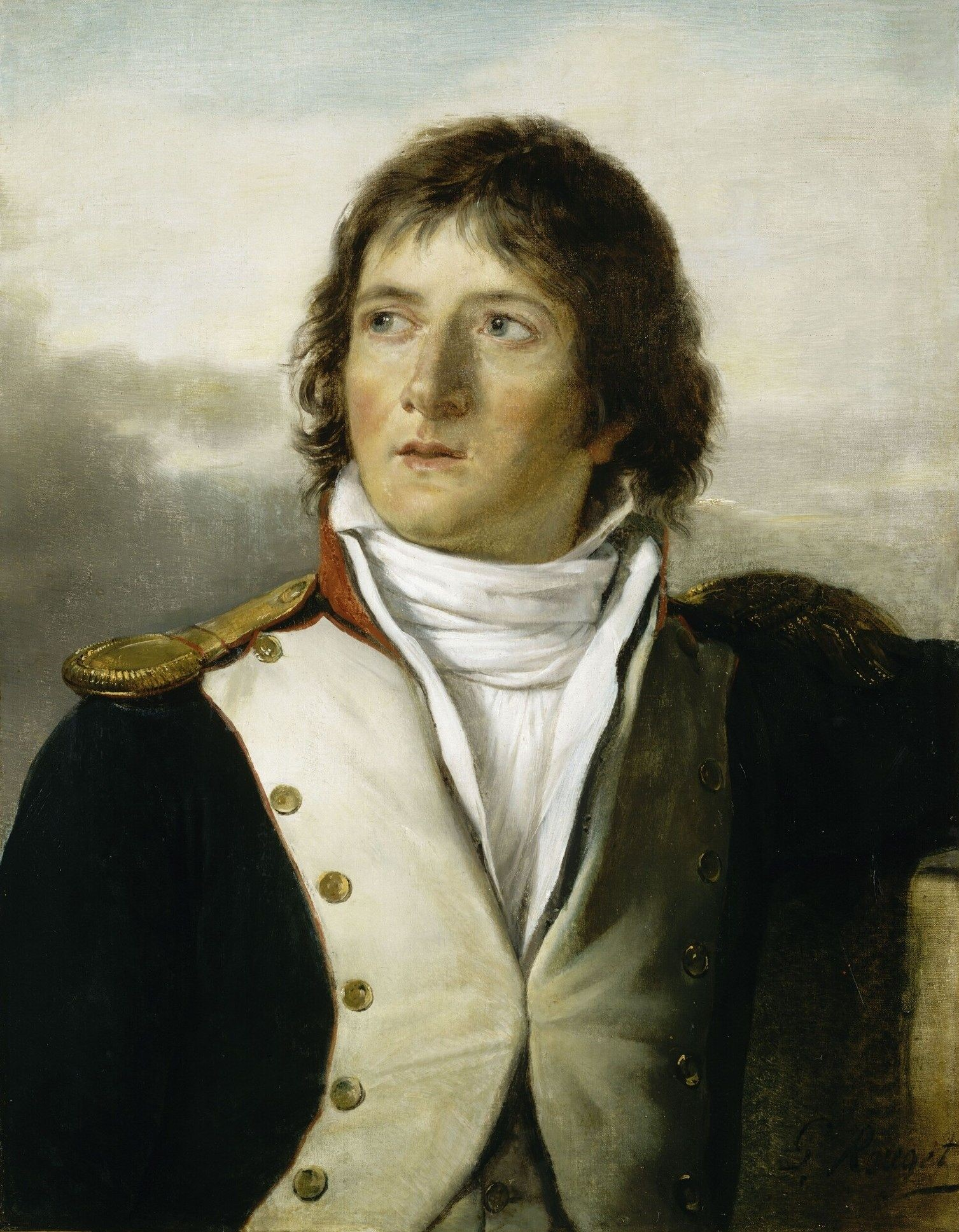
Laurent Saint-Cyr

On 1 July 1796, Ferino's Right Wing was organized into one division under Delaborde and four brigades led by Nicolas Louis Jordy, Nicolas Augustin Paillard, Jean Victor Tharreau and Jean-Baptiste Tholmé. Jordy led the 3rd and 38th Line Infantry Demi Brigades. Tharreau directed the 3rd Light and the 56th, 74th, 79th and 89th Line Infantry Demi Brigades. Paillard commanded the 12th and 21st (heavy) Cavalry Regiments while Tholmé commanded the 18th Cavalry, 4th Dragoon and 8th Hussar Regiments. Tuncq was not listed as leading a division. Ferino's wing counted 18,622-foot soldiers and 1,039 horsemen.

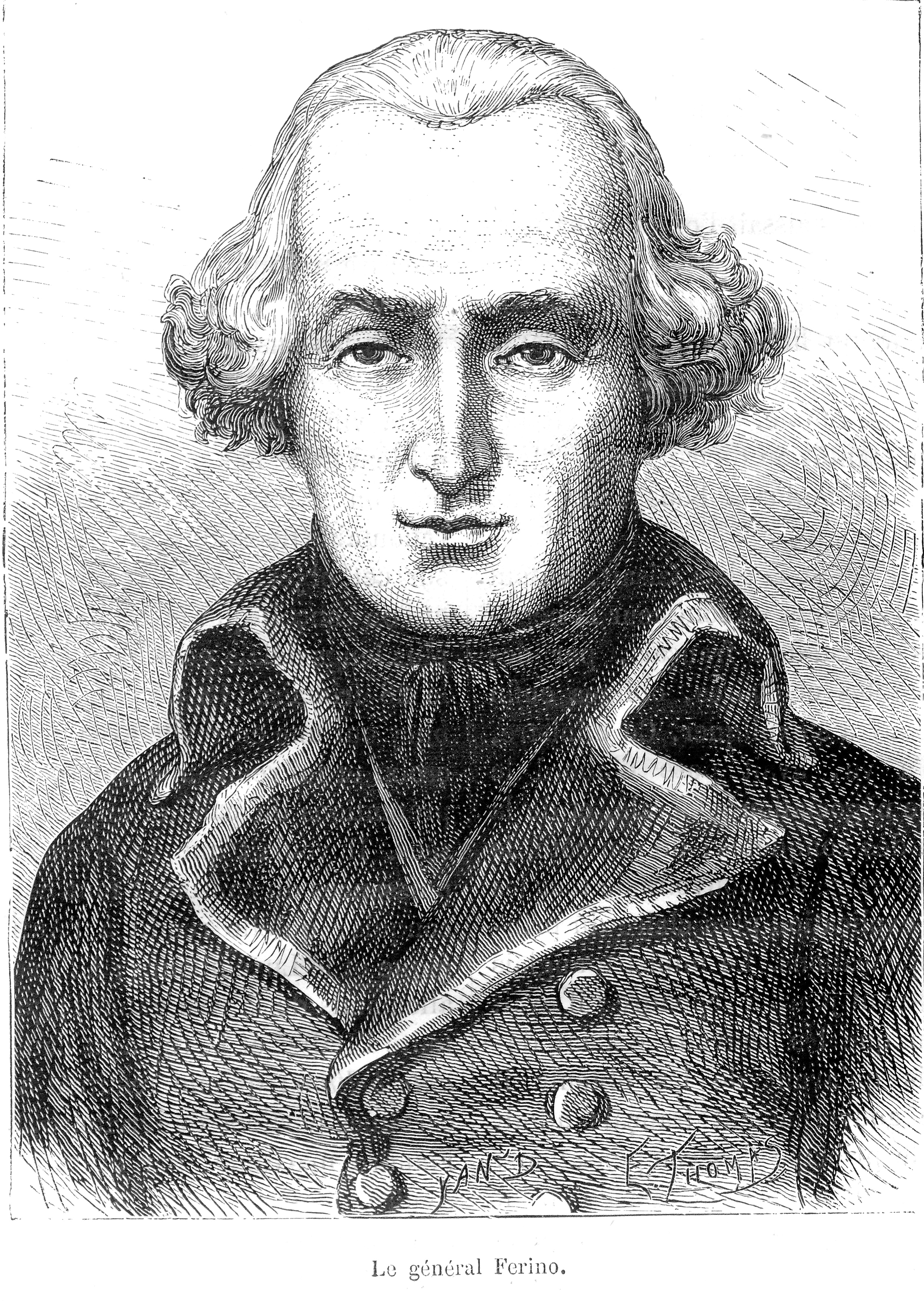
Pierre Ferino

At the same date, Desaix's Left Wing was made up of the divisions of Beaupuy and Delmas. In Beaupuy's division, Dominique Joba led the 10th, 62nd and 103rd Line and the 10th Light Demi Brigades while Gilles Joseph Martin Brunteau Saint-Suzanne commanded the 4th and 8th Chasseurs à Cheval and the 6th Dragoons. In Delmas' division Jean Marie Rodolph Eickemeyer directed the 50th and 97th Line and 16th Light Infantry Demi Brigades while Maurice Frimont led the 7th Hussar and 10th and 17th Dragoon Regiments. Xaintrailles was not named as a division commander. Desaix's command comprised 17,126 bayonets and 2,058 sabers.

A report from 9 July 1796 showed that Saint-Cyr's Center had two divisions under Duhesme and Taponier. In Duhesme's division, Dominique Vandamme's brigade included the 17th Line (2,793) and 100th Line (2,479), 20th Chasseurs à Cheval (254) and 11th Hussars (38). Duhesme's division counted 5,272 infantry and 292 cavalry. Taponier's division consisted of the brigades of Henri François Lambert, Antoine Laroche Dubouscat and Claude Lecourbe. Lambert led the 93rd Line (3,119) and 109th Line (2,769). Laroche directed the 21st Light (2,284) and 31st Line (2,840). Lecourbe commanded the 84th Line (2,692), 106th Line (3,186) and 2nd Chasseurs à Cheval (240). There were a total of 22,162-foot soldiers, 532 horsemen and 433 gunners in Saint-Cyr's wing. However, a 14 June report showed 919 troopers present in Saint-Cyr's command, including the 9th Hussars.

On 1 July, Bourcier's Reserve division comprised one brigade under Jean Marie Forest with the 93rd and 109th Line (detached to Saint-Cyr by 9 July), the 1st and 2nd Carabiniers and the 3rd, 9th, 14th and 15th Cavalry Regiments. The cavalry counted 1,577 sabers. In Moreau's army, all infantry demi brigades had three battalions, all Cavalry regiments had three squadrons, while Carabinier, Chasseur, Dragoon and Hussar Regiments had four squadrons. There were 8,201 infantry and 238 cavalry in garrison at Bitche, Kehl, Landau and Strasbourg. Marc Amand Élisée Scherb with 2,812-foot and 239 horse watched the Austrian-held Philippsburg fortress. Moreau's chief of staff was Jean Reynier and his chief of artillery was Jean Baptiste Eblé. Moreau had 36,000 men available in 45 battalions and 55 squadrons.

=== Austrian army ===
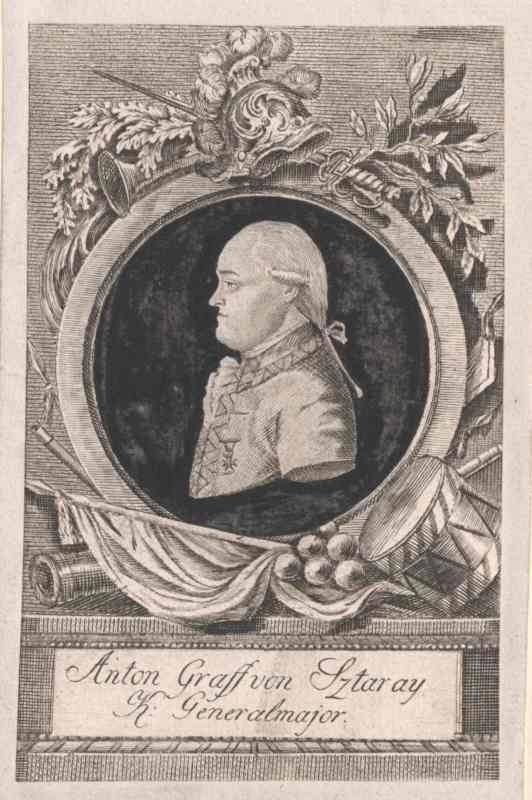
Anton Sztáray

On 3 July, the Army of the Upper Rhine was organized into divisions under Fröhlich, Fürstenberg, Sztáray and Johann Sigismund Riesch. In addition, Archduke Charles personally commanded divisions under Friedrich Freiherr von Hotze and von Lindt. Fröhlich had three brigades led by Condé, Johann Jacob von Klingling and Simon von Wolf. Fürstenberg led seven brigades under Zaiger, Milius, Joseph Heinrich von Staader, Ignaz Gyulai, Johann Baptist von Leloup, Franz Walter Anton von Canisius and Paul Devay. The last two brigades were detached to Latour's direct command along with the divisions Sztáray and Riesch. Sztáray's division included five brigades under Ludwig Wilhelm Anton Baillet de Latour-Merlemont, Konrad Valentin von Kaim, Prince Joseph de Lorraine-Vaudemont, Duke Alexander of Württemberg and Johann I Joseph, Prince of Liechtenstein. Riesch's division had three brigades under Count Palatine, Adam Boros de Rákos and an unknown officer. In the archduke's corps, Hotze commanded three Austrian brigades under Wilhelm Lothar Maria von Kerpen, Franz Seraph of Orsini-Rosenberg and Joseph von Schellenberg. Lindt led five Electoral Saxon brigades.

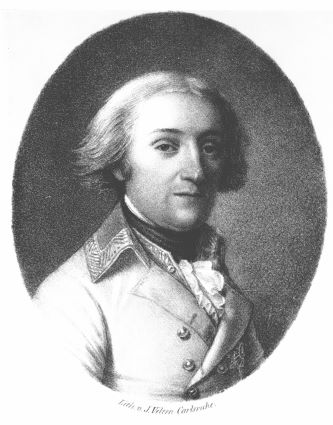
Karl zu Fürstenberg

The Austrian order of battle for 9 July showed the army organized into four columns. The 1st Column under Kaim included two brigades under Schellenberg and Christoph von Lattermann. Schellenberg had two battalions each from Grand Duke of Tuscany Nr. 23 and Olivier Wallis Nr. 29 Infantry Regiments, six companies from the 2nd and 3rd Battalions of the Slavonian Infantry Regiment and one squadron of the Archduke Ferdinand Hussar Regiment Nr. 32. Lattermann led three battalions of the Archduke Charles Nr. 3 Infantry Regiment, the Abfaltern and Retz Grenadier Battalions and two squadrons each of the Szekler Hussar Regiment and Waldeck Dragoon Regiment Nr. 39.

Sztáray commanded the 2nd Column which consisted of an Advanced Guard under Devay, two brigades led by Latour-Merlemont and the Prince of Lorraine and two unbrigaded mounted units, four squadrons each of the Archduke John Dragoons Nr. 26 and Waldeck Dragoons. Devay led two battalions of the Pellegrini Nr. 49 Infantry Regiment, one battalion each of the Splenyi Nr. 51 and Serbian Infantry Regiments, seven squadrons of the Archduke Ferdinand Hussars and six squadrons of the Kinsky Chevau-légers Nr. 7. Latour-Merlemont commanded three battalions of the Manfredini Nr. 12 Infantry Regiment and the Candiani, Dietrich, Reisingen and Warren Grenadier Battalions. Lorraine directed four squadrons each of the Kavanaugh Nr. 12 and Archduke Franz Nr. 29 Cuirassiers.

Latour led the 3rd Column which was organized into an Advanced Guard under Canisius and three brigades directed by Kerpen, Liechtenstein and Württemberg. Canisius commanded three battalions of the Franz Kinsky Nr. 47 Infantry Regiment, four companies from the Serbian and three companies of the Slavonian Infantry Regiments, six squadrons of the Lobkowitz Chevau-légers Nr. 28, four squadrons of the Szekler Hussars and two squadrons of the Coburg Dragoons Nr. 37. Kerpen led three battalions of the Alton Nr. 15 Infantry Regiment and the Bideskuty, Szenassy and Benjowski Grenadier Battalions. Liechtenstein controlled three squadrons of the Kaiser Dragoons Nr. 1. Württemberg directed six squadrons of the Mack Nr. 20 and four squadrons of the Ansbach Nr. 33 Cuirassiers.

The small 4th Column was commanded by Johann Nepomuk von Mosel and consisted of two battalions of the Schröder Nr. 7 Infantry Regiment, one battalion of the Leloup Jägers and two squadrons each of the Albert Nr. 5 and Kaiser Nr. 15 Carabiniers. Lindt's Saxon infantry was made up of the Brandenstein and Glaffay Grenadier Battalions, one battalion of Weimar Jägers, and one battalion each of the Kürfurst, Prinz Anton, Prinz Clemens, Prince Gotha and Van der Hayde Infantry Regiments. The Saxon mounted troops included four squadrons each of the Carabinier, Hussar and Prinz Albert and Courland Chevau-léger Regiments plus two squadrons of the Saxe-Gotha Cavalry Regiment. Altogether, Charles had about 32,000 troops available.

=== Combat ===
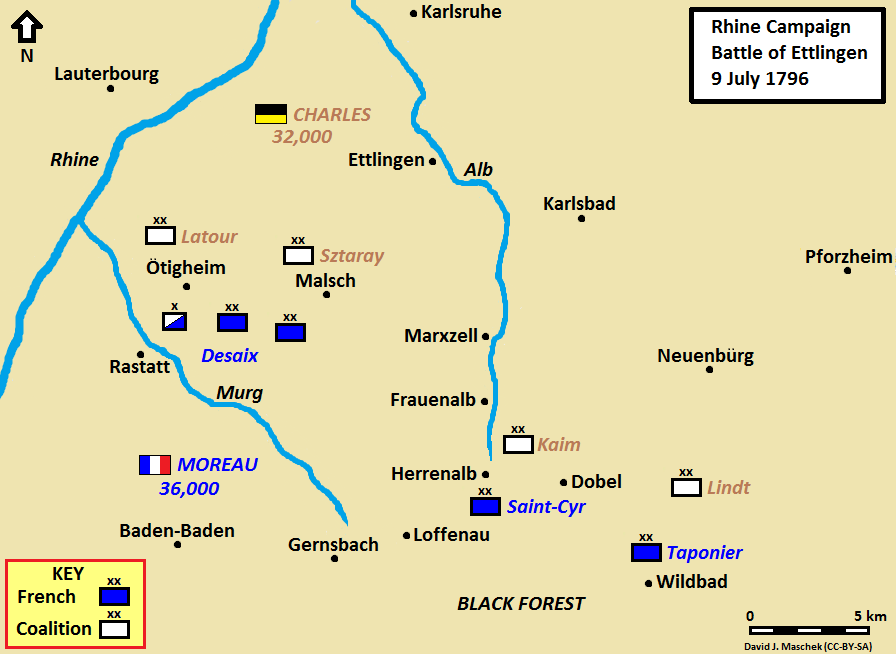
In the Battle of Ettlingen on 9 July 1796, the right wing of Archduke Charles drove back Moreau's left wing, but Saint-Cyr's wing overcame the Coalition troops in the Black Forest.

After conferring with Desaix and Saint-Cyr at Renchen, Moreau mounted his assault on 9 July 1796. This decision preempted Archduke Charles, who had planned to attack the French on the 10th. The French commander planned to pin the Austrians in the Rhine plain while turning their left flank among the mountains of the Black Forest. For his part, Charles hoped to outflank the French left near the river and recapture Gernsbach. Latour held the Austrian right near the Rhine, Sztáray was posted in the center near Malsch, Kaim defended the left-center in the hills along the Alb River and Lindt's Saxons held the far left near Neuenbürg.

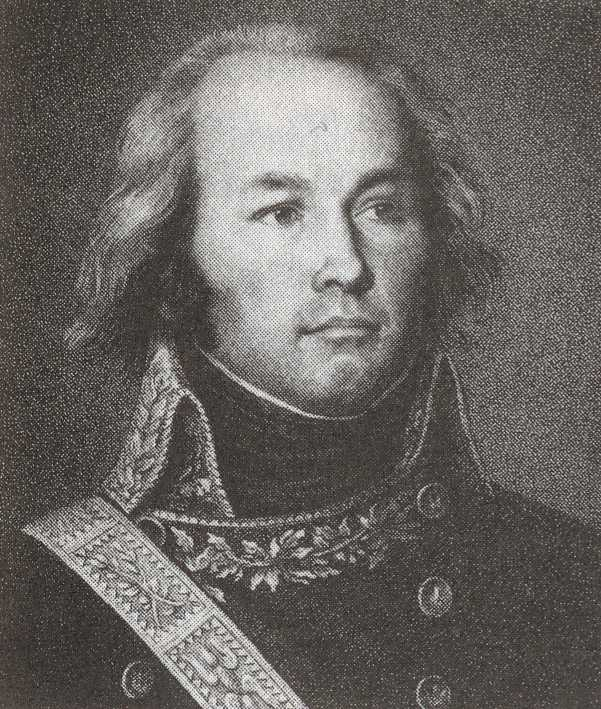
Claude Lecourbe

Moreau accompanied Desaix's Left Wing with the divisions of Delmas and Sainte-Suzanne (vice Beaupuy), Bourcier's Reserve and Saint-Cyr's cavalry and horse artillery which were ineffective in the mountains. Malsch was captured twice by the French and recaptured each time by the Austrians. Latour tried to force his way around the French left with cavalry but was checked by the mounted troops of the Reserve. Finding his horsemen outnumbered near Ötigheim, Latour used his artillery to keep the French cavalry at bay. In the Rhine plain the combat raged until 10 PM. In the evening the Austrians were pushing Desaix back when bad news from the left flank caused Charles to call a halt.

Kaim had six battalions of infantry, four squadrons of cavalry and plenty of artillery deployed at Rothenzholl. He posted three more battalions at Frauenalb to the north and an advance guard in Loffenau. Saint-Cyr left Duhesme's division behind to guard Freudenstadt and the Kneibis Mountain. He started from Gernsbach with 12 battalions plus six more borrowed from the Reserve. Finding that the Saxons were marching south along the Enz River to turn his right flank, he sent Taponier with six battalions and 150 hussars east to Wildbad. Taponier surprised the Saxons and sent them scurrying back north. With Lambert and Lecourbe's brigades, Saint-Cyr advanced through Loffenau to Rothenzholl northwest of Dobel where he confronted Kaim. Finding the Austrians in powerful defenses, Saint-Cyr tried to draw Kaim's troops out of position.

Employing elements of the 84th and 106th Line, the French wing commander ordered the troops not to press home their assault, but to retreat every time they came against strong resistance. Each attack was pushed farther up the ridge before receding into the valley. When the fifth assault in regimental strength gave way, the defenders finally reacted, sweeping down the slope to cut off the French. Saint-Cyr now sprung his trap. Lecourbe led the massed grenadier companies to attack one Austrian flank, other reserves bored in on the other flank and the center counterattacked. The French troops that struck the Austrian right were hidden in the nearby town of Herrenalb. As the Austrians gave way, the French followed them up the ridge right into their positions. Nevertheless, Kaim's men laid down such a heavy fire that Lecourbe's grenadiers were thrown into disorder and their leader nearly captured. At length, Saint-Cyr's troops emerged triumphant, inflicting 1,000 casualties on their opponents and capturing two cannons. Kaim was compelled to withdraw east across the hills to Neuenbürg. From there, Kaim and Lindt's soldiers fell back toward Pforzheim.

== Results ==
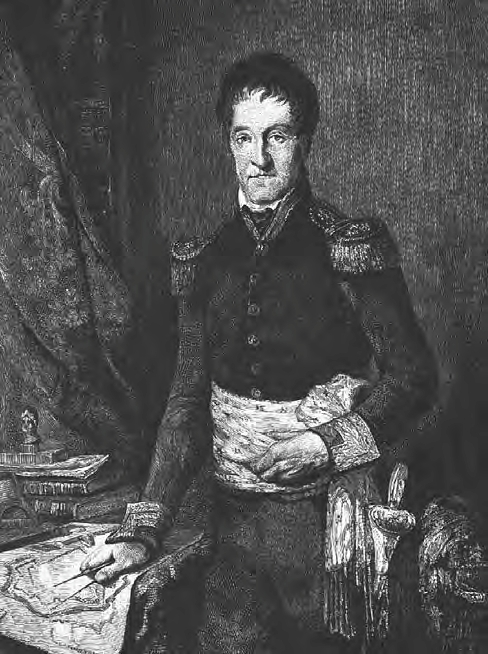
Lazare Carnot

French losses numbered 2,000 killed and wounded plus 400 captured. The Austrians suffered 1,300 killed and wounded with 1,300 captured. On 10 July, Charles evacuated Malsch and ordered a forced march east to Pforzheim via Karlsruhe. Also on the 10th, the French occupied Ettlingen and Neuenbürg. Anxious to protect his magazines at Heilbronn, Charles halted at Pforzheim for a few days. For his part, Moreau would not believe that Charles had given up, so he waited around Ettlingen for several days. Meanwhile, the Austrians packed their supplies into wagons and headed east on 14 July. The next day, Moreau moved on Pforzheim but found the archduke gone.

When Archduke Charles withdrew from the Rhine valley, he left about 30,000 troops in garrisons along the river. There were 15,000-foot and 1,200 horse in Mainz, 3,000 infantry in Ehrenbreitstein, 8,800 infantry and 300 cavalry in Mannheim and 2,500-foot soldiers in Philippsburg. To contain the first two, Jourdan left 28,545 troops under François Séverin Marceau-Desgraviers while Moreau only detailed 2,800 infantry and 240 cavalry to watch the last two places. For the most part, the Austrian garrisons remained quiescent. But the Austrians in Mannheim caused mischief by attacking Kehl on 18 September. More might have been accomplished in that assault, but the Austrian soldiers paused to pillage the French camp and were driven off by their enemies. Even so, Charles not only lost the services of the 30,000 men in the fortresses but also of the Swabians, Saxons and other German allies when he retreated from the Rhine. These auxiliary forces began to negotiate with the French when their territories were occupied.

Historian Ramsay Weston Phipps believed that Charles might have remained along the Rhine and defeated the French armies one after the other. Unlike the divided command of the French, the Austrians enjoyed unity of command. After Ettlingen, Phipps thought that the correct French strategy was for the two French armies to join. However, this was not part of Carnot's plan, which was for each army to operate against the Austrian flanks. Carnot's strategy had succeeded in 1794 during the Flanders Campaign and he expected that it would win again. However, in 1794 the Coalition was made up of several countries with different vulnerabilities, while in 1796 Charles could issue a command and expect it to be obeyed. The next clash would be the Battle of Neresheim on 11 August.

== External sources ==
These sources identify the Austrian regiment numbers.

- Pivka, Otto von (1979). Armies of the Napoleonic Era. New York, N.Y.: Taplinger Publishing. ISBN 0-8008-5471-3.
- German Wikipedia List of Austrian Cavalry Regiments

These sources provide the full names and other identifying information of French and Austrian generals from the Napoleonic period.

- Broughton, Tony (2006). "Generals Who Served in the French Army during the Period 1789–1815". The Napoleon Series.
- Smith, Digby; Kudrna, Leopold. "Biographical Dictionary of all Austrian Generals during the French Revolutionary and Napoleonic Wars, 1792–1815". napoleon-series.org.
