= Alexandre Camille Taponier =

French general

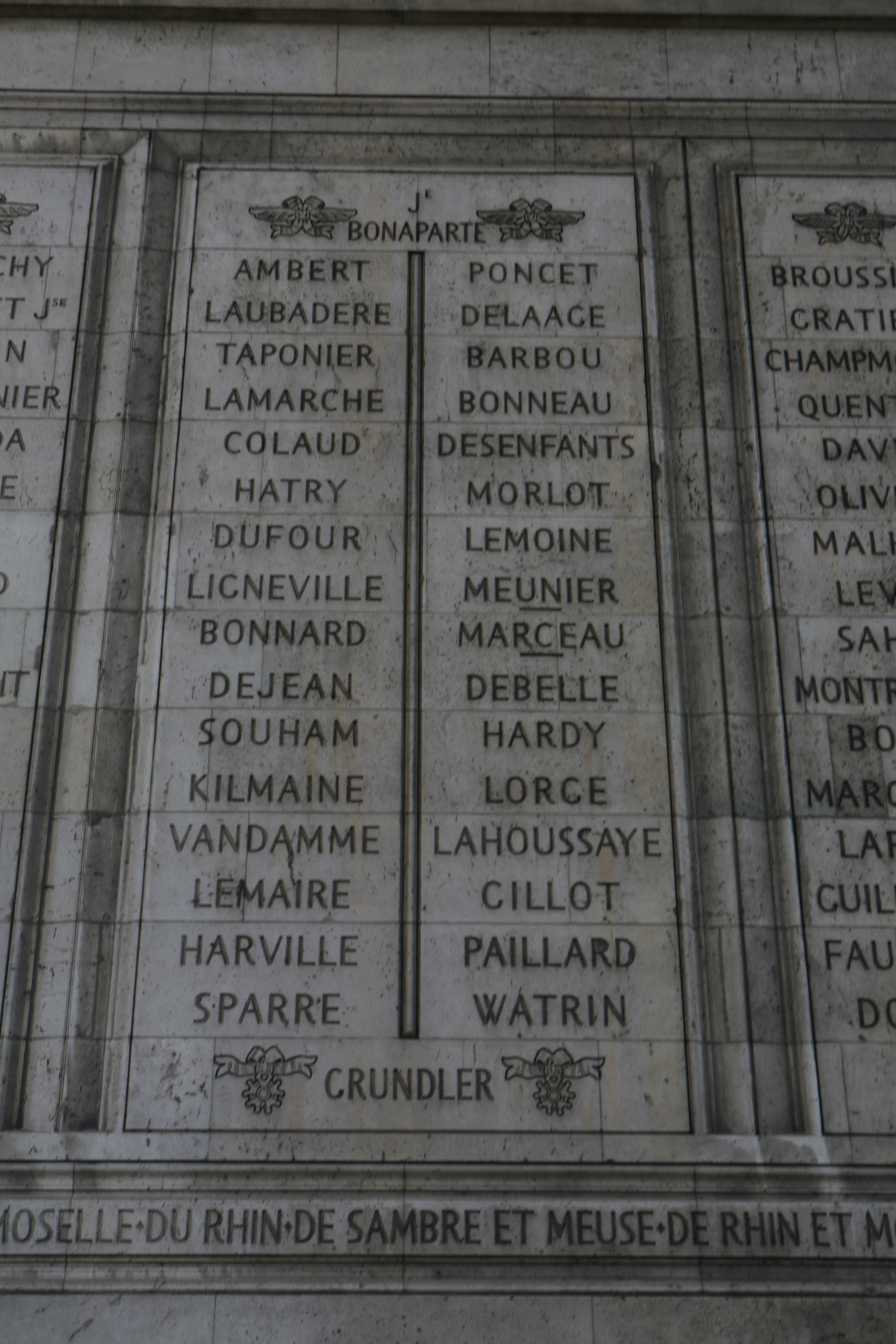
- Taponier is the third name on Column 5.
- Born: 2 February 1749; Valence, France
- Died: 13 April 1831 (aged 82) Vanves, Paris, France
- Allegiance: France
- Branch: Infantry
- Service years: 1767–1811
- Rank: General of Division
- Conflicts: War of the First Coalition; Battle of Kaiserslautern; Battle of Froeschwiller; Second Battle of Wissembourg; Siege of Luxembourg; Battle of Ettlingen; Battle of Neresheim
- Awards: Legion of Honour, 1805

Alexandre Camille Taponier (2 February 1749 – 13 April 1831) commanded an infantry division in several battles during the French Revolutionary Wars. He joined the French Royal Army in 1767. He became a chef de bataillon on 15 October 1793 and a general of division less than two months later on 7 November, a speed of promotion that is astonishing. He led his division at the end of 1793 in the battles of Kaiserslautern, Froeschwiller and Second Wissembourg.

He led a division at the Siege of Luxembourg in 1794–1795 and at Ettlingen and Neresheim in 1796. That summer, army commander Jean Victor Marie Moreau forced him to resign after accusing him of demanding irregular contributions. Placed on active service again, he commanded the 13th Military Division for a few months in 1799–1800. He became a member of the Legion of Honour in 1805 but was not employed during the Napoleonic Wars and retired from military service in 1811 at age 62. Taponier is one of the names inscribed under the Arc de Triomphe on Column 5.
