= Frœschwiller =

Frœschwiller Freschwiller
- Commune
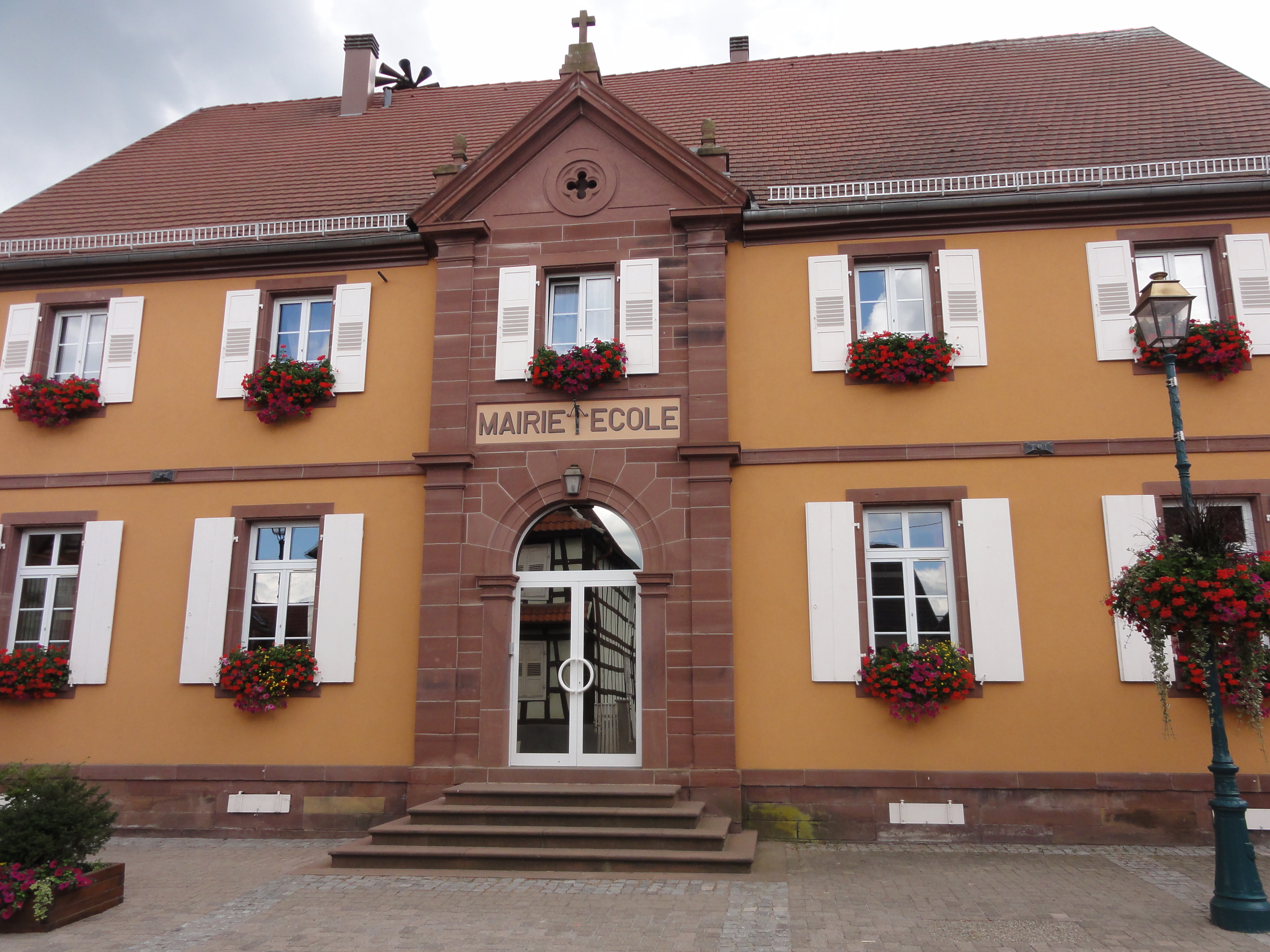
- The town hall in Frœschwiller

- Coat of arms
- Location of Frœschwiller
- Location within France Location within Grand Est
- Coordinates: 48°56′40″N 7°43′22″E
- Country: France
- Region: Grand Est
- Department: Bas-Rhin
- Arrondissement: Haguenau-Wissembourg
- Canton: Reichshoffen

Government
  - Mayor (2020–2026): Marc Bastian
- Area^{1}: 5.75 km^{2} (2.22 sq mi)
- Highest elevation: 262 m (860 ft)
- Lowest elevation: 188 m (617 ft)
- Population (2023): 482
  - Density: 83.8/km^{2} (217/sq mi)
- Time zone: UTC+01:00 (CET)
  - Summer (DST): UTC+02:00 (CEST)
- INSEE/Postal code: 67147 /67360
- ^{1} French Land Register data, which excludes lakes, ponds, glaciers > 1 km^{2} (0.386 sq mi or 247 acres) and river estuaries.

Frœschwiller (French pronunciation: [fʁœʃvilɛʁ]; German: Fröschweiler; Alsatian: Freschwiller) is a commune in the Bas-Rhin department in Grand Est in north-eastern France. Of note is Château de Frœschwiller.

The commune lies within the Northern Vosges Regional Nature Park.

== Historical vignettes ==
- In 1552 the Protestant Reformation reached Frœschwiller when Kuno Eckbrecht of Dürckheim ordered the construction of the village's first church on the seigneurial lands.

- On 22 December 1793 republican troops under General Lazare Hoche defeated the Habsburg army under Field Marshal Dagobert Sigmund von Wurmser in the Battle of Froeschwiller. This success helped to evict the Austrians from French territory.

- On 6 August 1870, as a result of the Battle of Frœschwiller-Wœrth, the two Alsatian départements (apart from the area that subsequently became the Territory of Belfort) as well as most of the Moselle département were lost. They would remain under German control until 1918.

== See also ==
- Communes of the Bas-Rhin department
