= Siege of Landau (1793) =

Siege of the War of the First Coalition

Coordinates: 49°12′N 8°7′E

- Part of War of the First Coalition
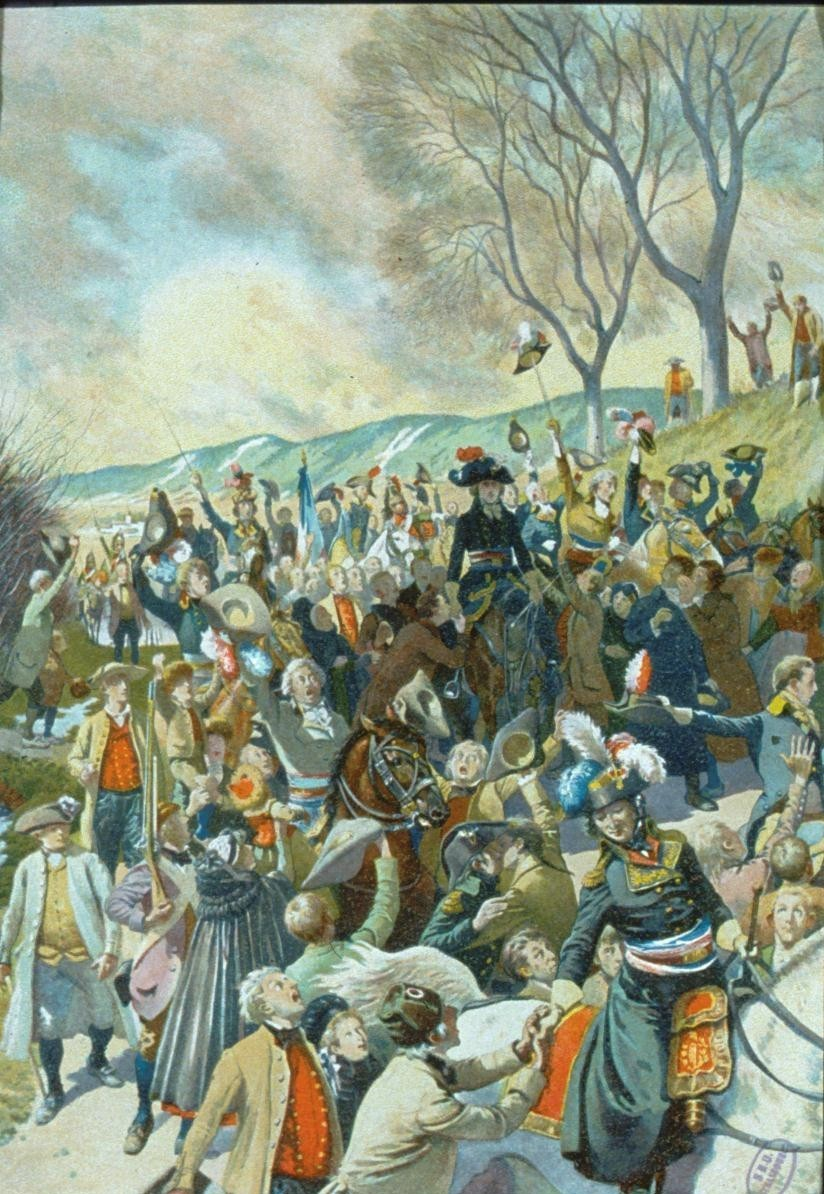
- Liberation of Landau by the French 24th December 1793 (by Frédéric Régamey, 1905)
Date	20 August – 23 December 1793
Location	Landau, Rhineland-Palatinate, Germany
Result	French victory

Belligerents
Republican France	Kingdom of Prussia

Commanders and leaders
(France) Joseph Laubadère (France) fr:Joseph Marie Tennet de Laubadère	(Kingdom of Prussia) Prince Hohenlohe

Strength
3,800	25 battalions

The siege of Landau (20 August – 23 December 1793) saw a corps from the Kingdom of Prussia commanded by Frederick Louis, Prince of Hohenlohe-Ingelfingen lay siege to a 3,800-man French Republican garrison led by Joseph Marie Tennet de Laubadère. Since the Prussians lacked siege cannons, they tried to starve the French defenders into surrender by blockading the city. In late December, the French Army of the Moselle under Lazare Hoche and Army of the Rhine under Jean-Charles Pichegru defeated the Coalition armies opposed to them, forcing the Prussians to raise the War of the First Coalition siege.

Almost two months after Landau was surrounded, the Coalition army won a victory in the First Battle of Wissembourg, driving the Army of the Rhine deep into Alsace. The French government placed a priority on relieving Landau, so Pichegru's army began a sustained offensive against Dagobert Sigmund von Wurmser's Coalition army in the Battle of Haguenau. The effort finally succeeded when Hoche's army outflanked Wurmser in the Battle of Froeschwiller and then the combined French armies won the Second Battle of Wissembourg over Wurmser and Charles William Ferdinand, Duke of Brunswick-Wolfenbüttel in late December.

== Forces ==
Joseph Marie Tennet de Laubadère commanded the 3,800-strong French garrison of Landau. The force included one battalion each of the 3rd and 55th Line Infantry Regiments, the 2nd Battalion of the Seine-et-Marne National Guard and two squadrons each of the 22nd Cavalry and 3rd Hussar Regiments. To oppose the defenders, Frederick Louis, Prince of Hohenlohe-Ingelfingen led 25 Prussian battalions supported by 40 6-pounder field cannons. Hohenlohe's force consisted of three battalions each of Infantry Regiments Thadden Nr. 3, Manstein Nr. 9, Romberg Nr. 10, Kleist Nr. 12, Wegnern Nr. 30, Hohenlohe Nr. 32, Wolframsdorf Nr. 37 and Hertzberg Nr. 47, the Schladen Grenadier Battalion and five foot artillery batteries.
