= Egau =

River in Germany

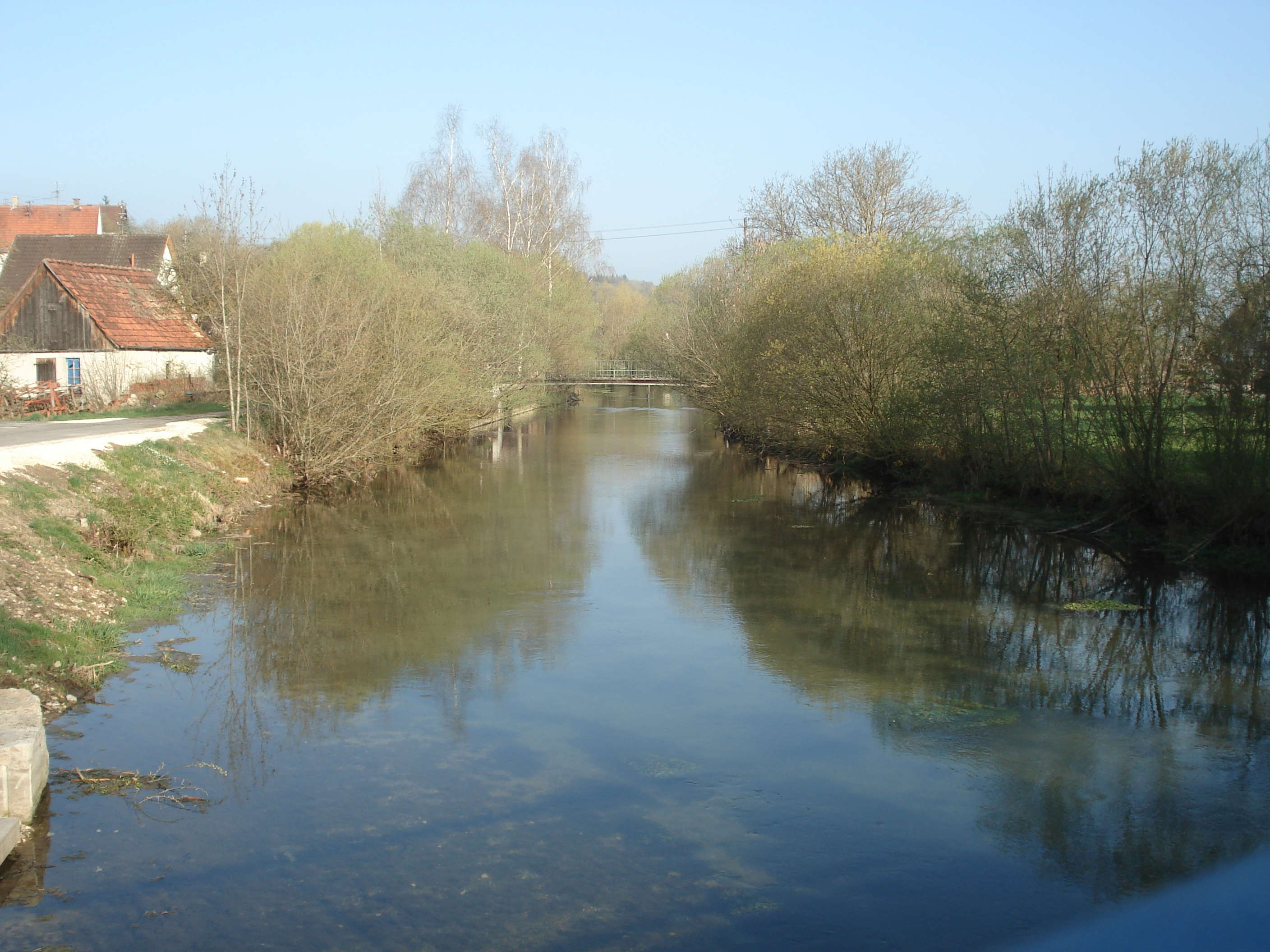
- The Egau in Ballmertshofen

Location
- Country: Germany
- States: Baden-Württemberg and Bavaria

Physical characteristics
- Mouth
  - location: Danube
  - coordinates: 48.6039°N 10.5852°E
- Length: 45.0 km (28.0 mi)
- Basin size: 443 km^{2} (171 sq mi)

Basin features
- Progression: Danube→ Black Sea

Egau is a river of Baden-Württemberg and Bavaria, Germany. It flows into the Danube near Höchstädt an der Donau.

== See also ==
- List of rivers of Baden-Württemberg
