= Dominique Joba =

French military engineer (1759–1809)

- Born: 19 November 1759; Corny, Moselle, Kingdom of France
- Died: 6 September 1809 (aged 49); Girona, Spain
- Military career
- Allegiance: France
- Branch: Infantry
- Rank: Général de brigade
- Conflicts: See list: War of the Bavarian Succession; Austro-Turkish War; Siege of Belgrade; French Revolutionary Wars; War in the Vendée; Second Battle of Châtillon; Second Battle of Cholet; War of the Second Coalition; Battle of Ettlingen; Battle of Biberach; Napoleonic Wars; Peninsular War; Siege of Girona
- Awards: Legion of Honour

Dominique Joba (Note: Charles Napier (1842) erroneously refers to him as Jobard.) (19 November 1759 – 6 September 1809) was a French engineer and infantry commander who rose to the rank of general during the First French Empire. He was killed in action at the Siege of Girona.

== Early career ==
In 1776, as a military engineer, Joba worked on the repairs to the fortress of Luxemburg. In 1778, he led the siege of Blokuts, Silesia and then, in 1783, worked on the fortifications along the Scheldt. He then joined the army under General Laudon and in 1789 he was at the Siege of Belgrade.

== War in the Vendée ==
He was wounded at the Second Battle of Châtillon (October 1793) and at the Second Battle of Cholet.

== War of the First Coalition ==
At the Battle of Biberach (2 October 1800), where he served under y Louis Desaix, Joba was wounded by sabre cuts and gun shot and taken prisoner.

== War of the Second Coalition ==
In late December 1799, Joba headed one of the three brigades (the other two brigade generals were Sabatier and Roussel) based in Basel under Baraguey d'Hilliers's division of Saint-Cyr's Centre Corps of the Army of the Rhine and Moselle under Commander-in-Chief General Moreau.

On 1 May, these three brigade generals were still under the orders of Saint-Cyr and Baraguey d'Hilliers, By 10 May 1800, Joba's infantry brigade had joined the existing two brigades led by Generals Bonet and Bonnamy, when General Ney's division was expanded to some 6,900 troops and horse.

The following month, however, Ney's division had been reduced to the two brigades led by Bonet and Joba.

Joba, together with Generals of Brigade Bonet and Poissonnier made up Ney's 2nd Division (9,630 troops, 12 guns) on Grenier's Left Wing at the Battle of Hohenlinden (3 December).

== Peninsular War ==
In May 1809, Joba commanded the 1st Brigade (2,365 troops) under Général de division Verdier's division at the siege of Girona. He was killed in action at the combat of San Gregorio, where he had been sent with three brigades to clear the main road to Figueras of the miqueletes led by Rovira and Claros.

== See also ==
- List of French generals of the Revolutionary and Napoleonic Wars
