= Battle of Froeschwiller (1793) =

1793 battle of the War of the First Coalition

Coordinates: 48°56′40″N 7°43′22″E

- Part of War of the First Coalition
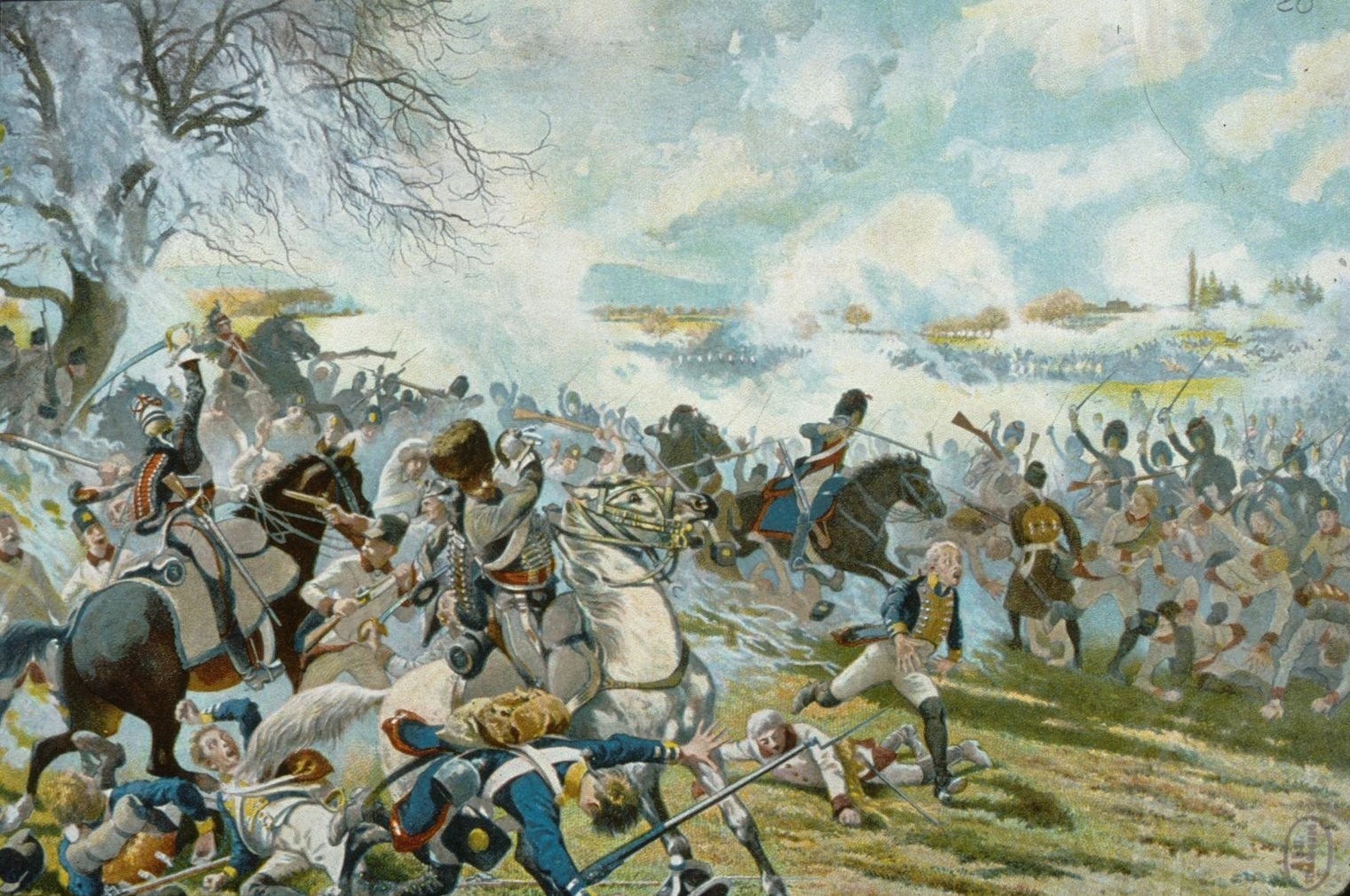
- Battle of Frœschwiller, 22 December 1793; Frédéric Régamey, 1905
Date	18–22 December 1793
Location	Froeschwiller, France
Result	French victory

Belligerents
(French First Republic) Republican France	(Habsburg monarchy) Habsburg Austria

Commanders and leaders
(French First Republic) Lazare Hoche (French First Republic) Charles Pichegru	(Habsburg monarchy) Count von Wurmser

Units involved
(French First Republic) Army of the Moselle (French First Republic) Army of the Rhine	(Habsburg monarchy) Army of the Rhine

Strength
25,000	15,000

Casualties and losses
1,000	2,000; 16 guns

The Battle of Froeschwiller (18–22 December 1793) saw Republican French armies led by Lazare Hoche and Charles Pichegru attack a Habsburg Austrian army commanded by Dagobert Sigmund von Wurmser. On the 18th, a French attack pushed back the Austrians a short distance. After more fighting, a powerful assault on the 22nd forced the entire Austrian army to withdraw to Wissembourg. The action occurred during the War of the First Coalition, part of the Wars of the French Revolution. Froeschwiller is a village in Bas-Rhin department of France, situated about 50 kilometres (31 mi) north of Strasbourg.

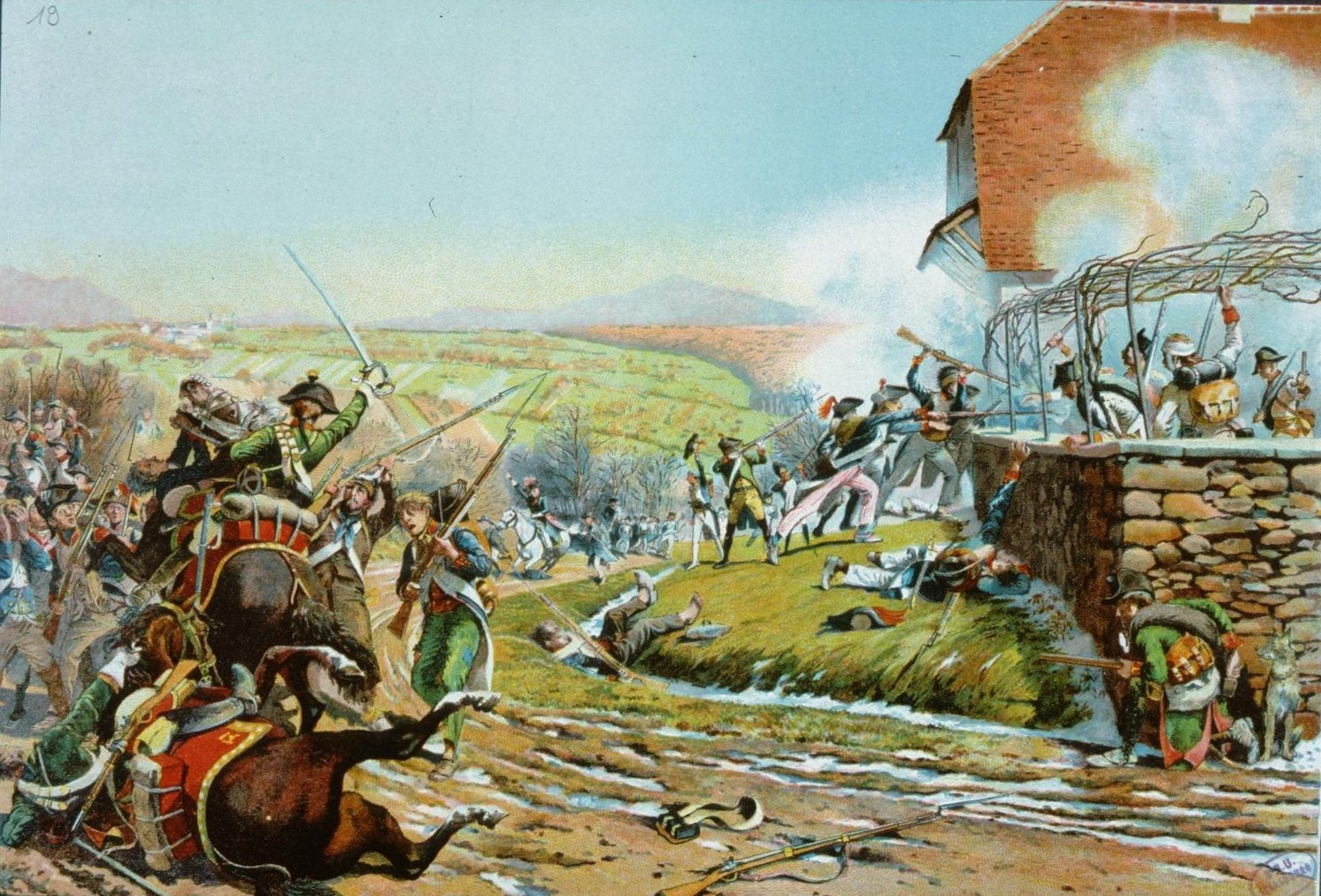
Battle of Froeschwiller at 22 December 1793: French infantry taking the town of Froeschwiller (by Frédéric Regamey, 1905)

The Austrian victory in the First Battle of Wissembourg threatened to overrun the territory of Alsace. Hoche assumed command of the Army of the Moselle and attacked the Prussian army in the Battle of Kaiserslautern without success. However, the French took advantage of the lack of cooperation between the Prussians and their Austrian allies. Hoche sent 12,000 troops under Alexandre Camille Taponier through the Palatinate Forest to attack Wurmser's right flank at Froeschwiller. On 22 December, Hoche launched a successful assault with five divisions while Pichegru's Army of the Rhine attacked Wurmser from the south. The Second Battle of Wissembourg on 25–26 December would decide the fate of Alsace.
