= Battle of Kaiserslautern (1794) =

Battle of the War of the First Coalition

Coordinates: 49°26′41″N 7°46′8″E

- Part of War of the First Coalition
Date	23 May 1794
Location	Kaiserslautern, Electoral Palatinate, modern-day Germany
Result	Prussian victory

Belligerents
Kingdom of Prussia; Saxony (Habsburg monarchy) Habsburg Austria (Electorate of Bavaria) Electoral Bavaria	(French First Republic) Republican France

Commanders and leaders
(Kingdom of Prussia) Wichard Möllendorf (Kingdom of Prussia) Prince Hohenlohe (Habsburg monarchy) Prince Hohenlohe	(French First Republic) René Moreaux (French First Republic) Jean Ambert (French First Republic) Claude Michaud

Strength
Kaiserslautern: 46,000; Schifferstadt: 30,000	Kaiserslautern: 5,000; Schifferstadt: 20,000

Casualties and losses
Kaiserslautern: 110; Schifferstadt: 900	Kaiserslautern: 1,000, 17 guns, 2 colors Schifferstadt: 500

The Battle of Kaiserslautern (23 May 1794) saw an army from the Kingdom of Prussia and Electoral Saxony led by Wichard Joachim Heinrich von Möllendorf fall upon a single French Republican division under Jean-Jacques Ambert from the Army of the Moselle. The Prussians tried to surround their outnumbered adversaries but most of the French evaded capture. Nevertheless, Möllendorf's troops inflicted casualties on the French in the ratio of nine-to-one and occupied Kaiserslautern. While the Prussians won this triumph on an unimportant front, the French armies soon began winning decisive victories in Belgium and the Netherlands. The battle occurred during the War of the First Coalition, part of the French Revolutionary Wars. In 1794 Kaiserslautern was part of the Electoral Palatinate but today the city is located in the state of Rhineland-Palatinate in Germany about 67 kilometres (42 mi) west of Mannheim.

In December 1793, the French drove the soldiers of Habsburg Austria and Prussia from French soil in the Second Battle of Wissembourg and took positions beyond the eastern frontier. That spring the Army of the Moselle sent heavy reinforcements to northeast France, leaving the Rhine front lightly defended by troops under Jean René Moreaux. Taking advantage of French weakness, the main Prussian assault was aimed at Ambert who could only try to save as many of his troops as possible. Also on 23 May an Austro-Prussian army attacked the Army of the Rhine under Claude Ignace François Michaud but was repulsed at the Battle of Schifferstadt. After losing Kaiserslautern, the two French armies withdrew to positions closer to the frontier. Having expended almost the only initiative they displayed in 1794, the Prussians allowed their offensive to sputter to a halt.

== Background ==
On 26 December 1793, Lazare Hoche, in overall command of his own Army of the Moselle and Jean-Charles Pichegru's Army of the Rhine defeated the Coalition army of Dagobert Sigmund von Wurmser in the Second Battle of Wissembourg. Though part of the Prussian army of Charles William Ferdinand, Duke of Brunswick-Wolfenbüttel intervened late in the day, it could only keep the French from launching a close pursuit. Three days later, Wurmser's army crossed to the east bank of the Rhine River at Philippsburg. The two French armies pressed north along the west bank of the Rhine and relieved the siege of Landau. Brunswick's Prussians withdrew all the way to Worms and Oppenheim.

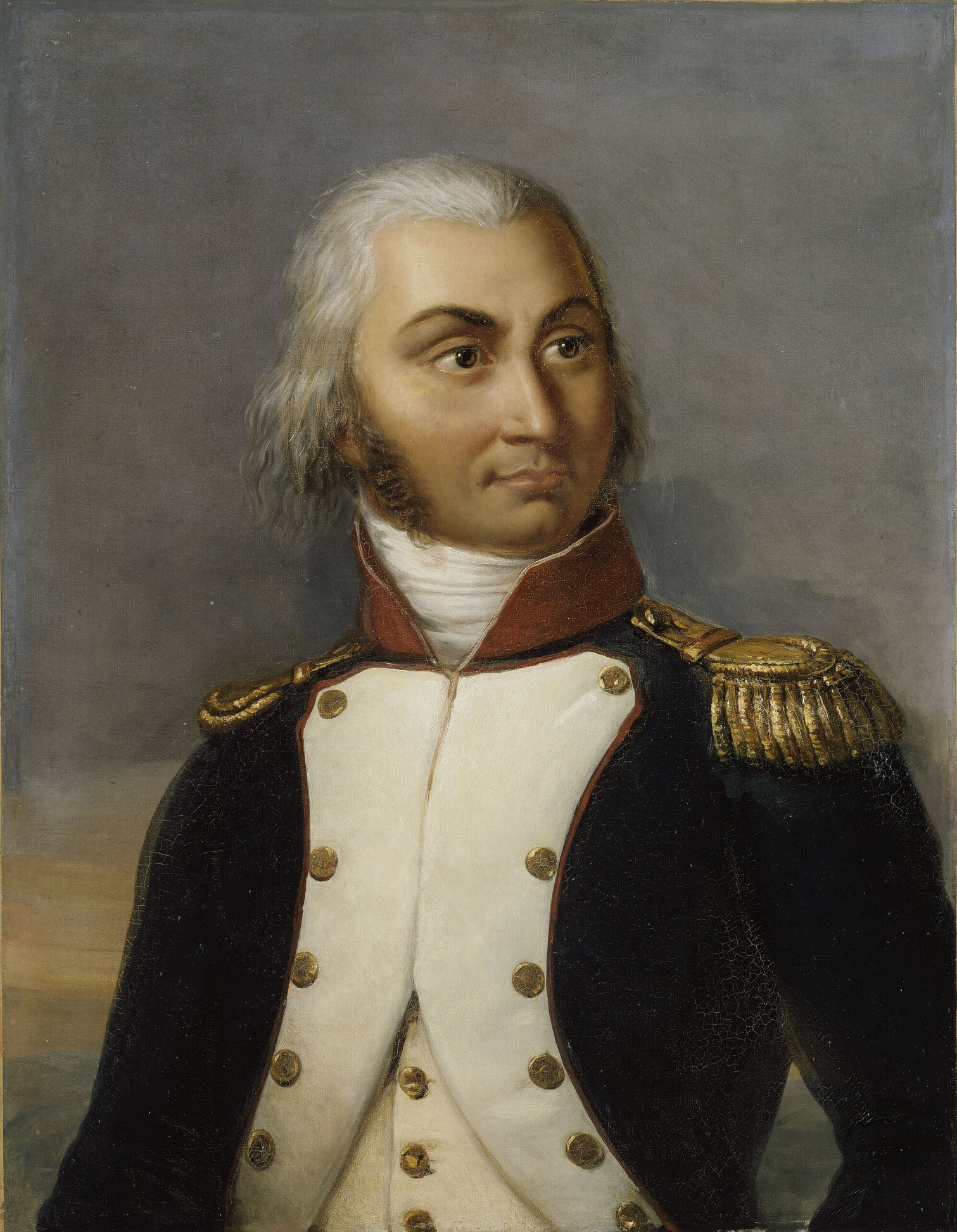
Jean-Baptiste Jourdan

While the right wing of the Army of the Moselle advanced to Speyer, the left wing under Jean René Moreaux occupied Kaiserslautern on 1 January 1794. The French pursued as far north as Bad Kreuznach before encountering Prussian resistance and falling back to Kaiserslautern. On 18 January the Coalition garrison withdrew from Fort-Louis and blew up the fortifications. On 14 January Pichegru was relieved in command of the Army of the Rhine by Claude Ignace François Michaud. This ended the constant bickering that had sprung up between him and Hoche. The Prussians were not fully committed to the war because their leaders were divided over whether it was more important to crush the French Revolution or participate in the Third Partition of Poland. As it was, Prussia wished to leave the Coalition at the end of 1793, but kept fighting in 1794 when the United Kingdom paid to keep 60,000 of its troops in the field. Fed up with interference from King Frederick William II, who was more interested in Poland, Brunswick resigned command of the army.

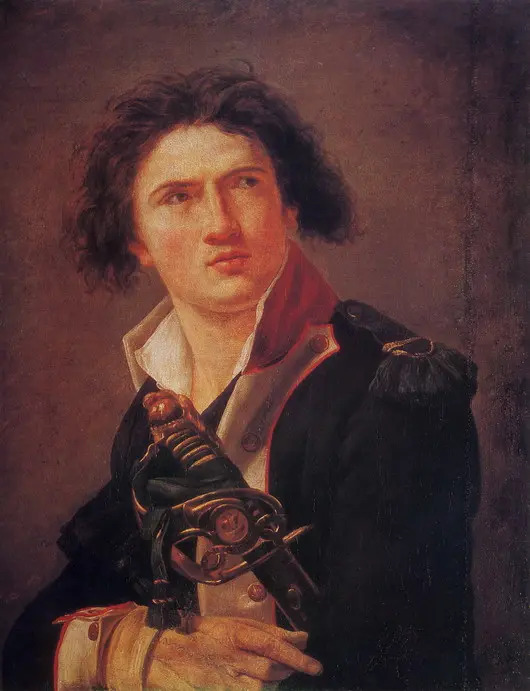
Lazare Hoche

On 19 February 1794, the Army of the Moselle under Hoche counted the divisions of Jean Étienne Championnet, Claude François Desbureaux, Jacques Maurice Hatry, François Joseph Lefebvre, Moreaux, Antoine Morlot and Nicolas Augustin Paillard. The army numbered 76,489 but there were only 47,665 effectives. Orders from the government arrived to advance on Trier which Hoche objected to because the army lacked boots and many other supplies. The advance started anyway but it was quickly called off and the army took up winter quarters along the Blies and Saar Rivers. By this time Committee of Public Safety had come to mistrust Hoche as too successful and therefore a threat. Hoche was put under arrest and remained in prison until the Thermidorian Reaction when Maximilien Robespierre and his associates were sent to the guillotine. On 10 March 1794 Jean-Baptiste Jourdan was ordered to assume command of the Army of the Moselle.

On 15 March, Jourdan ordered the army's left wing to advance to Arlon while giving Moreaux command of the army's right wing. Setting up his headquarters at Blieskastel, Moreaux moved his divisions forward with his right flank in Kaiserslautern. Meanwhile, the army's left wing occupied Arlon on 15 April. At first the 21,788-man left wing was under the command of Hatry. On 2 May, Jourdan personally took command of the army's left wing and reinforced it so that it numbered 56,014 troops, although there were only 31,548 effectives. The left wing included the divisions of Championnet, Hatry, Lefebvre and Morlot. These headed north with Jourdan and left the eastern theater altogether. Though Jourdan nominally led the army until 25 June, for all practical purposes the Army of the Moselle (that is, the right wing) was under the command of Moreaux from 2 May.

Moreaux received some reinforcements taken from the Army of the Rhine so that he had 25,000 soldiers in three divisions thinly deployed between Longwy on the west and Kaiserslautern on the east. Meanwhile, the Army of the Rhine under Claude Ignace François Michaud counted 38,500 men, but only 30,000 were able to take the field. These were spread out along the Speyerbach River between Speyer and Neustadt an der Weinstrasse, with Louis Desaix's division on the right by the Rhine. Moreaux's positions were vulnerable to attack from Wichard Joachim Heinrich von Möllendorf's Prussian army to his front and the Austrians in Trier and Luxembourg City on his left. Michaud's army faced the Prussian left wing under Frederick Louis, Prince of Hohenlohe-Ingelfingen and the Habsburg Austrians led by Friedrich Wilhelm, Fürst zu Hohenlohe-Kirchberg.

== Combat of Kaiserslautern ==
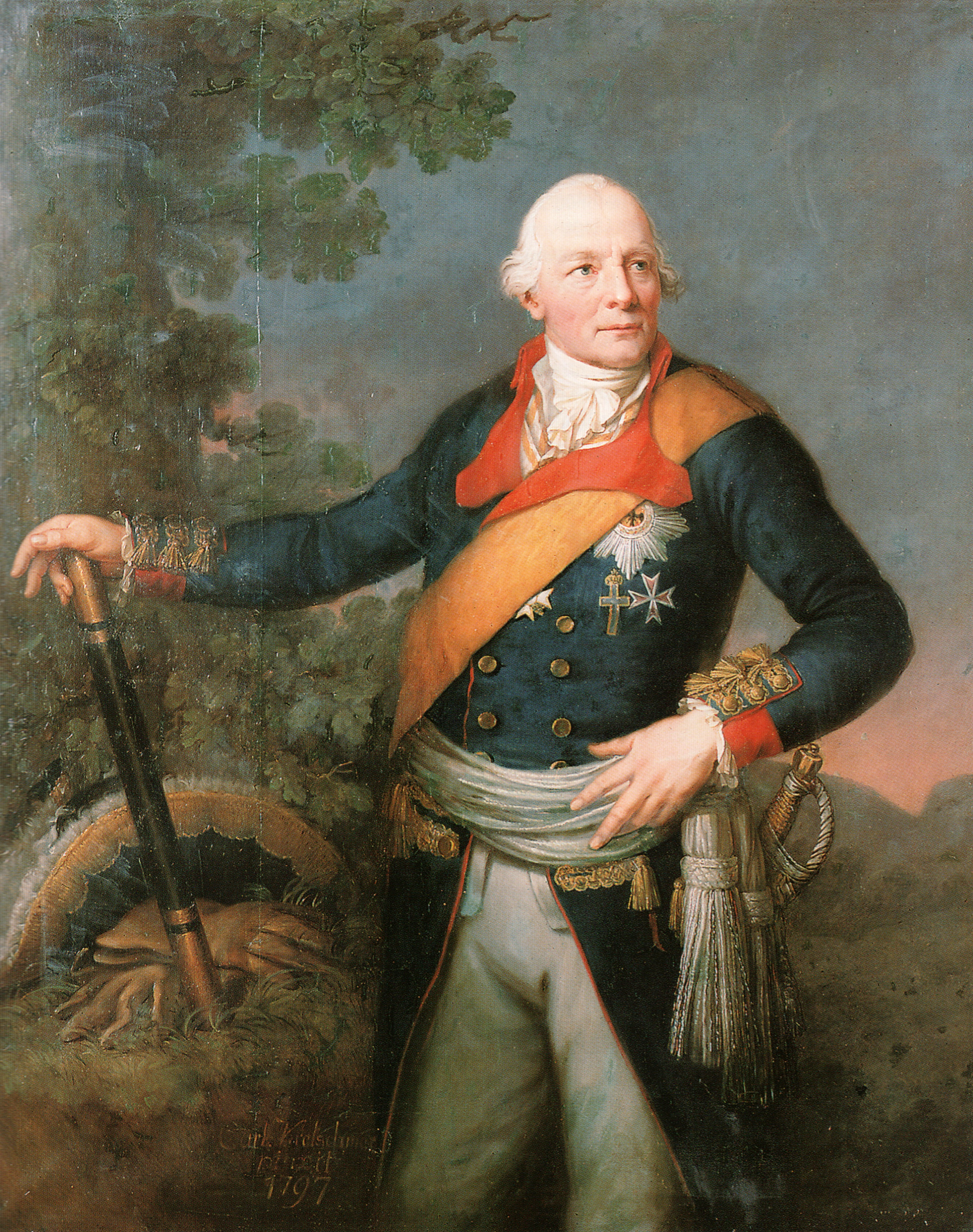
Wichard von Möllendorf

Though aware of the weakness of his defense lines, Moreaux did not want to retreat, possibly because he was masking Jourdan's transfer of troops to the north. Kaiserslautern was held by the division of Jean-Jacques Ambert with eight battalions, a cavalry regiment and two squadrons of chasseurs à cheval. Many of the soldiers were raw recruits and some were not even armed. One of the few veteran battalions was commanded by Nicolas Oudinot. Anxious about the position, Moreaux sent Laurent Gouvion Saint-Cyr, an adjutant general whose advice he trusted, to look over the ground. Saint-Cyr advised Ambert to retreat but that general had orders to hold his ground though he had only 5,000 troops. Meanwhile, Möllendorf chose to make his main effort against Kaiserslautern.

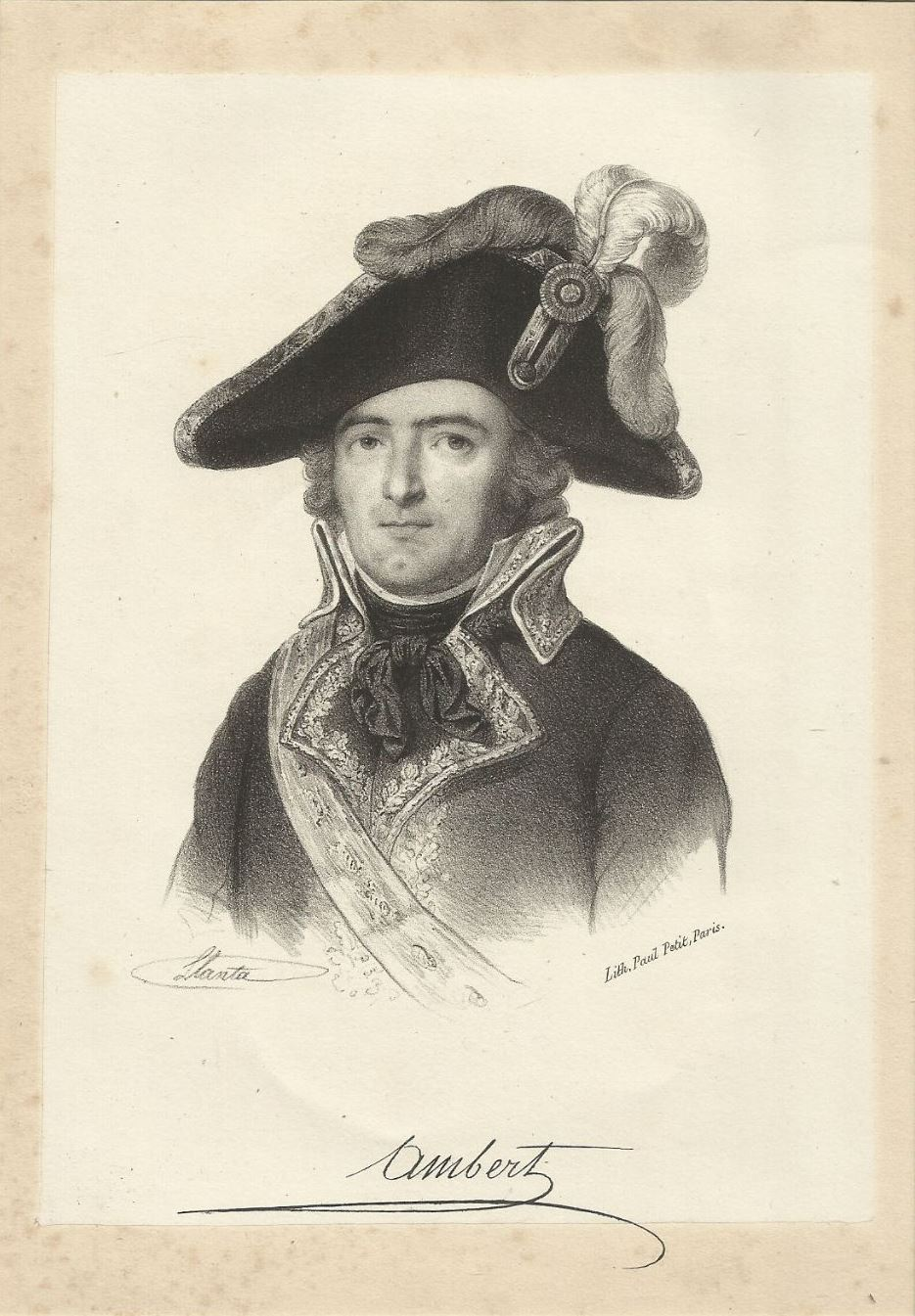
Jean-Jacques Ambert

Möllendorf massed 46,000 Prussian and Electoral Saxon troops in 43 battalions, four companies, 42 squadrons and 10 1/2 batteries. The divisions were commanded by Friedrich Adolf, Count von Kalckreuth, Alexander von Knobelsdorff, Franz Kasimir von Kleist, Friedrich Gisbert Wilhelm von Romberg, Ernst von Rüchel, and Duke Louis of Württemberg. Kalckreuth's Prussian units included the Infantry Regiments Crousaz Nr. 39 (two battalions), Hertzberg Nr. 47 (grenadier battalion) and Borch Nr. 39 (three battalions) and three squadrons of the Bayreuth Dragoon Regiment Nr. 5. Kalckreuth's Saxon contingent was made up of one battalion each of Infantry Regiments Langenau, Lindt, Prinz Max and Prinz Xaver, four squadrons each of the Kurfürst Cuirassier and Albrecht Chevau-léger Regiments and two squadrons of the Hussar Regiment. Kalckreuth led one Saxon howitzer battery and two foot and 1/2 horse artillery batteries of Prussians. The remaining divisions were composed entirely of Prussian troops and invariably counted three infantry battalions in each infantry regiment.

Knobelsdorf's division comprised the Infantry Regiments Thadden Nr. 3, Kalckstein Nr. 5 and Kleist Nr. 12, the Thadden Fusilier Battalion Nr. 13, two squadrons of the Eben Hussar Regiment Nr. 2, one Jäger company and one foot artillery battery. Kleist's division was made up of the Infantry Regiments Knobelsdorff Nr. 27 and Prinz Ferdinand Nr. 34, two squadrons of the Voss Dragoon Regiment Nr. 11 and one foot artillery battery. Romberg's division consisted of the Infantry Regiments Brunswick Nr. 21, Prinz Heinrich Nr. 35 and Köthen Nr. 48, the Eben Hussars, one Jäger company and one foot artillery battery. Rüchel's division had the Infantry Regiments Rüchel Nr. 30 and Wolframsdorff Nr. 37, the Ernest Fusilier Battalion Nr. 19, three squadrons each of the Eben Hussars and Voss Dragoons, three Jäger companies and one horse and two foot artillery batteries. Württemberg's cavalry division included five squadrons each of the Leib Cuirassier Nr. 3, Borstell Cuirassier Nr. 7 and Lottum Dragoon Nr. 1 Regiments and one foot artillery battery.

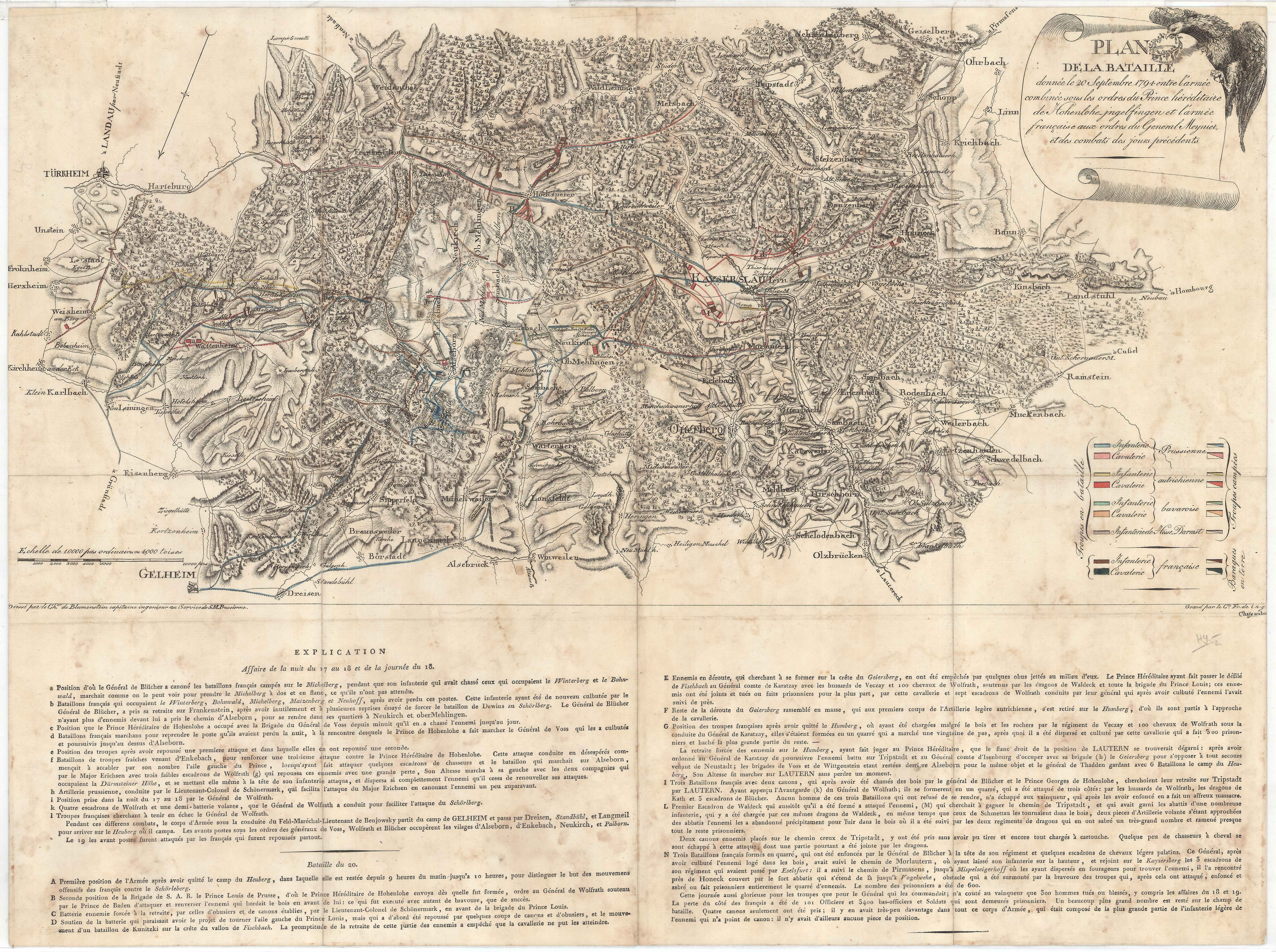
Map of a later Battle of Kaiserslautern on 20 September 1794

On 23 May, Ambert and Saint-Cyr heard the sound of gunfire and rode out to investigate. They discovered that the Army of the Rhine was under assault to the east. Saint-Cyr convinced Ambert that it was time to withdraw, since it was likely that their own lines would soon be attacked in force. Before anything more could be done, the Prussian attack materialized. Saint-Cyr successfully managed the retreat of the forward elements behind the Lauter River. Then Ambert determined to retreat in two columns, personally taking the left column while Saint-Cyr led the right column. Möllendorf planned to envelop and capture Ambert's division entirely, sending out Kleist's division to head off the French retreat. A flying column under Gebhard Leberecht von Blücher was sent to cut the link between the two French armies but this effort failed. The French were favored by the terrain in which the roads to the rear went through narrow passages, difficult for a pursuer to follow.

Saint-Cyr put his cavalry and artillery in the middle of his leading unit and was able to avoid pursuit. His column arrived at Trippstadt as the town was being attacked by Kleist. This lucky accident allowed Saint-Cyr's column to easily brush off Kleist's division and escape. Ambert's column had more trouble. His infantry was supposed to hold the edge of a forest until the cavalry and artillery of the rear guard reached it. By some error, the foot soldiers continued on their march. The Prussian horsemen routed their adversaries and the defeated French cavalry stampeded through the ranks of their own infantry, causing chaos. Oudinot's battalion, made of sterner stuff, chased off the Prussian cavalry and returned to the edge of the woods where they recovered some of the abandoned artillery. However, they were unable to drag away the guns because the horse teams had been killed. Continuing the withdrawal, Oudinot's men encountered a Prussian roadblock, but forced their way through. The two retreating columns reassembled at Pirmasens except for some soldiers who fled as far as Bitche. At Kaiserslautern the French lost about 1,000 men killed, wounded or missing in addition to 17 artillery pieces and two colors. Total Prussian casualties were 110 while Saxon losses were unknown but very light.

== Combat of Schifferstadt ==
Meanwhile, the Coalition attack along the Rhine was repulsed by the divisions of Desaix and Pierre Marie Barthélemy Ferino. At Schifferstadt the French lost 500 killed and wounded out of 20,000 men engaged while the Coalition suffered 900 casualties out of 30,000. The Austrian forces engaged were the grenadiers of Infantry Regiments Reisky Nr. 13, Wilhelm Schröder Nr. 26, Strassoldo Nr. 27 and Olivier Wallis Nr. 29. The Bavarians involved in the clash were two battalions of the Combined Infantry Regiment and four squadrons of the Combined Chevau-léger Regiment.

Hohenlohe-Ingelfingen's Prussian infantry included three battalions each of Infantry Regiments Manstein Nr. 9, Romberg Nr. 10 and Hohenlohe Nr. 32, two battalions each of Infantry Regiments Schladen Nr. 41 and Kunitzky Nr. 42, Fusilier Battalions Renouard Nr. 2 and Martini Nr. 10 and two Jäger companies. The cavalry consisted of five squadrons each of Cuirassier Regiments Saxe-Weimar Nr. 6 and Leib-Carabinier Nr. 11, Dragoon Regiments Schmettau Nr. 2 and Katte Nr. 4 and Hussar Regiment Goltz Nr. 8 plus 10 squadrons of Hussar Regiment Wolfradt Nr. 6. There were five foot and two horse artillery batteries.

== Results ==
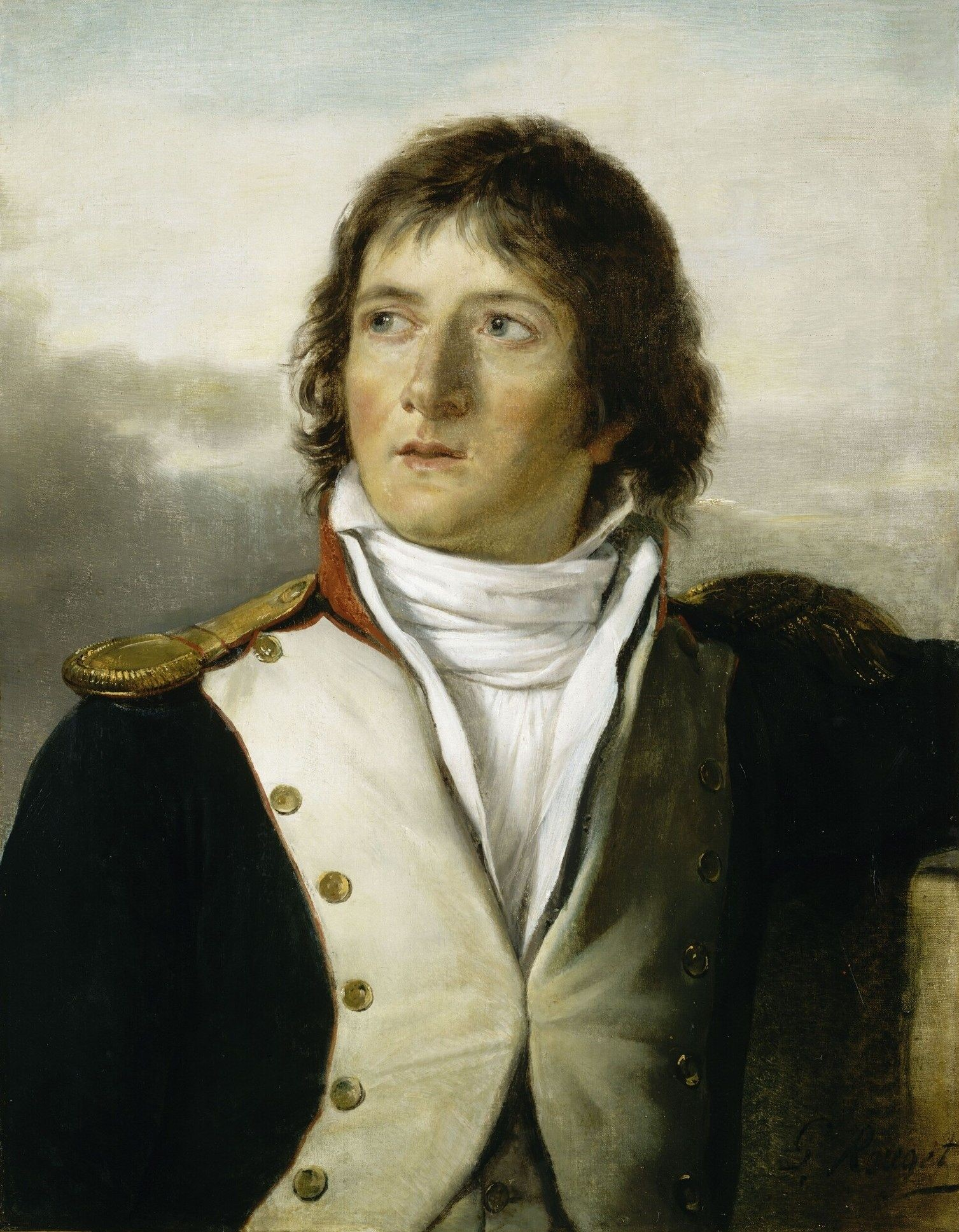
Laurent Saint-Cyr

After the loss of Kaiserslautern, the Army of the Moselle withdrew to the Saar while the Army of the Rhine retreated behind the Queich River to Landau. Möllendorf would have done better by following Jourdan to the north. His minor victory at Kaiserslautern was greatly overmatched by Jourdan's decisive triumph at the Battle of Fleurus. Möllendorf's offensive quickly ground to a halt and the Prussians set about building a series of armed camps to hold their newly captured territory. The next action in the theater occurred on 13–17 July in the Battle of Trippstadt. At the end of this battle on 17 July, the French occupied Kaiserslautern and moved forward to the Speyerbach again, wiping out all of the Coalition's recent gains.

Moreaux recognized the conduct of Saint-Cyr and Oudinot in his order of the day. On 10 June National Convention deputy Nicolas Hentz insisted that Saint-Cyr be elevated to general of brigade since he already commanded a brigade. When Saint-Cyr objected, the politician compelled him to accept the promotion by threatening to put him under police observation. Within a few days Hentz again promoted him to general of division. Saint-Cyr gave the excuse that another general with the same family name, Louis-Jean-Baptiste Gouvion was in disgrace and that suspicion would fall on himself. Hentz overrode this objection saying, "Is it only that? Can a brave man like you be hindered from serving the Republic well because there is a rascal in his family? You shall be general of division. I will it!" Saint-Cyr's fears were well-founded. In 1793, the revolutionaries executed 17 generals and in 1794 the number rose to 67. Saint-Cyr was assigned command of the 2nd Division of the Army of the Rhine while Oudinot received the rank of general of brigade in the Army of the Moselle.
