= Battle of Trippstadt =

1794 military action during the War of the First Coalition

- Part of the French Revolutionary Wars
Date	13–17 July 1794
Location	Trippstadt, in the Palatinate Forest 49°21′33″N 7°46′28″E
Result	French victory

Belligerents
(French First Republic) French Republic	Prussia (Holy Roman Empire) Habsburg Austria

Commanders and leaders
(French First Republic) Claude Michaud (French First Republic) René Moreaux (French First Republic) Alexandre Taponier (French First Republic) Laurent Saint-Cyr	(Kingdom of Prussia) Wichard Möllendorf (Holy Roman Empire) Hohenlohe-Kirchberg (Kingdom of Prussia) Prince Hohenlohe

Strength
50,000	70,000

Casualties and losses
Unknown	Unknown

Site of the Battle of Trippstadt

The Battle of Trippstadt was a relatively minor French military action in 1794 during the War of the First Coalition. The clash between the French Republican forces and the armies of Prussia and Habsburg Austria was fought over several days (13 to 17 July) in the Palatinate Forest in the German states west of the Rhine River. Fighting occurred across a wide front and included action in Kaiserslautern, Trippstadt, Schänzel and Neustadt and along the banks of the Speyerbach River.

The battle is also sometimes referred to as the Battle of Vosges, but most documented historical reports, including French- and German-language studies, refer to it as the Battle of Trippstadt. Some studies also mention Platzberg, but few studies call the action the Battle of Vosges.

== Introduction ==
During the first two years of the War of the First Coalition, the north-eastern frontier of France bordering the Holy Roman Empire along the Upper Rhine served as invasion route for the enemies of France.

In 1792, the Duke of Brunswick entered France through the north-eastern frontier in his attempt to support and rescue Louis XVI. In 1793, coalition forces including the Prussians and the Habsburg Austrians attempted to capture French fortresses along the Rhine and attacked the French defensive entrenchments along the Lauter River. By the summer of 1794, conflict in this theater of the war had reached a stalemate with armies facing each other in the Palatinate Forest of the lower Vosges Mountains.

At that time, the French Army of the Rhine, commanded by Claude Michaud, occupied a defensive position along the Queich River while the French Army of the Moselle commanded by René Moreaux occupied a defensive position along the Saar River.

Directly across from the "Moselle" to the north at Trippstadt were the Prussians commanded by Field Marshall Wichard Mollendorf. And directly across from the "Rhin" stretching from the Vosges Mountains east to the Rhine River were the Austrians commanded by Friedrich Wilhelm von Hohenlohe-Kirchberg and Prussians commanded by Prince Hohenlohe.

Given this standstill during the summer of 1794, the French armies were ordered to attack the armies of the coalition to prevent the Habsburg Austrians from sending reinforcements to the critical northern front in the Austrian Netherlands.

== Battle ==
On 17 June 1794, General Michaud held a council of war with the chief officers of the "Rhin" to discuss plans for an offensive. Generals Moreaux and Ambert of the "Moselle" were also in attendance, as the anticipated action was slated to be a joint attack by both French armies.

Disagreement as to the best offensive punch ensued, and the council ultimately decided to attempt a plan favoured by General Desaix with the cavalry leading the attack on the enemy's left by means of the Rhine flood plain.

On 2 July Michaud launched the agreed upon attack. On the extreme right, Desaix successfully pushed back the left wing of the coalition forces. Across the other fronts, however, the French armies were halted and then reversed through counterattacks by Prince Baden that inflicted approximately 1,000 casualties. This left Desaix's division exposed and isolated. Ultimately, Desaix withdrew and at the end of the day, there was no substantial change in the positions that French armies held at the start of hostilities.

At Michaud's next council of war, new plans were made to attack the coalition lines stretching from Kaiserslautern in the mountains, south to Trippstadt, down to the Rhine flood plain at Neustadt and along the Speyerbach River. In this offensive, the cavalry would be used at the outset only to hold the enemy in the front of the French armies while infantry units from both the "Moselle" and the "Rhin" confronted the enemy in the mountains.

On 13 July Michaud launched the second French offensive. In the center of the battle, French General Alexandre-Camille Taponier's division attacked the Prussian camp at Trippstadt. The attack was held off for an entire day, but overnight the Prussians pulled back to a position closer to Kaiserslautern. On the left, the French advance divided the coalition lines preventing the Austrians from supporting the Prussians. On Taponier's right, French General Laurent de Gouvion Saint-Cyr captured Johanniskreuz. Further to the right the Prussians held Schänzel against an attack from the west but were forced to retreat to Neustadt when the French attacked from the south via Albersweiler and Ramberg. Prussian General Theodor Philipp von Pfau was killed during the fighting at Schänzel.

General Michaud planned to continue the battle and attack the Prussians at Kaiserslautern on 16 July but overnight the evening before Hohenlohe retreated out of the mountains to Frankenthal on the Rhine. On 17 July Saint-Cyr advanced forward and the French occupied Kaiserslautern.

== Aftermath ==
This victory gave the French control of the mountain passes across the lower Vosges, but in the end, the battle was all for naught. Later in July, Michaud was ordered to move west to attack Trier near Luxembourg. In mid-September the Prussians attacked the weakened French forces in the north-eastern frontier and reoccupied Kaiserslautern. The French returned and the fighting continued until the Austrians abandoned the Netherlands and withdrew to the Rhine at Coblenz. With their northern flank now dangerously exposed, the coalition armies in the Upper Rhine withdrew east to the fortified city of Mainz.

== Sources ==
- Phipps, Ramsay Weston (2011). The Armies of the First French Republic: Volume II The Armées du Moselle, du Rhin, de Sambre-et-Meuse, de Rhin-et-Moselle. US: Pickle Partners Publishing. ISBN 978-1-908692-25-2.
- Rickard, John. "Combat of Platzberg and Trippstadt, 13–14 July 1794". Military History Encyclopedia on the Web.
- Smith, Digby (1998). The Greenhill Napoleonic Wars Data Book. London: Greenhill Books. ISBN 1-85367-276-9.
