= Jean René Moreaux =

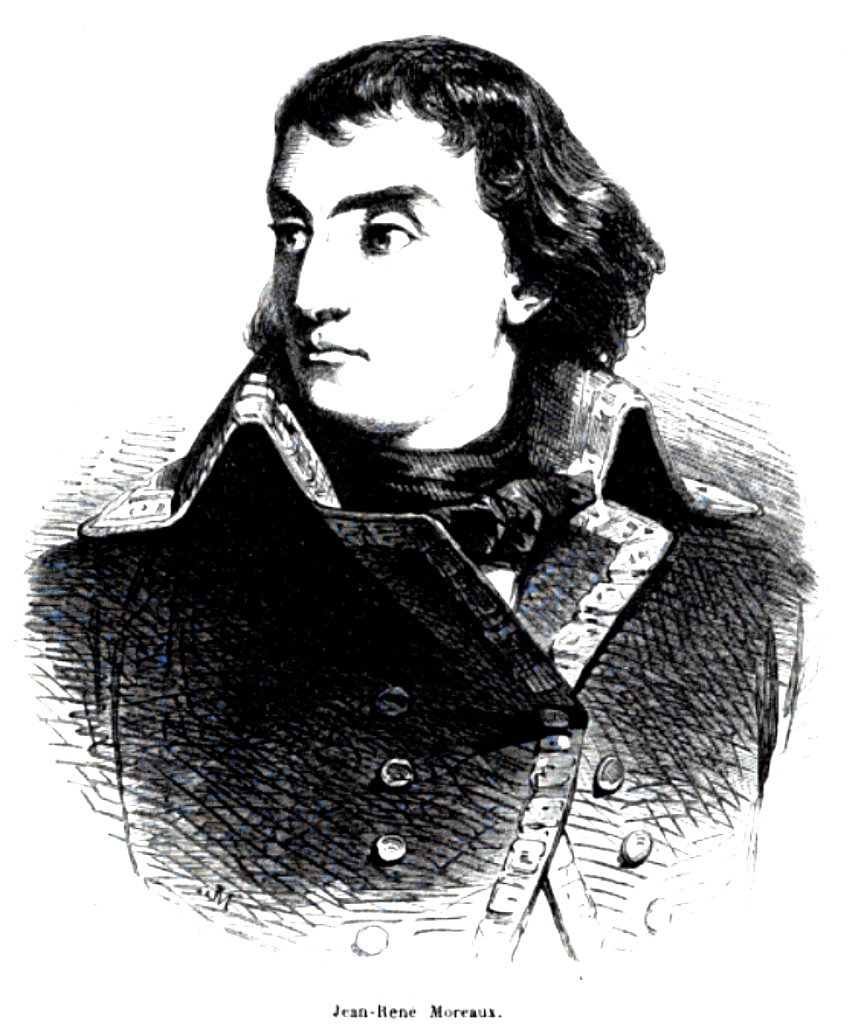
- Posthumous portrait by Léon Moreaux
- Born: 14 March 1758; Rocroi, France
- Died: 10 February 1795 (aged 36) Thionville, France
- Allegiance: France
- Branch: Infantry
- Service years: (Kingdom of France) 1776–1778 (France) 1791–1795
- Rank: General of Division
- Conflicts: American Revolutionary War; Capture of St. Lucia; War of the First Coalition; Siege of Thionville; Siege of Mainz; Battle of Pirmasens; Second Battle of Wissembourg; Siege of Luxembourg

Jean René Moreaux (14 March 1758 – 10 February 1795) commanded the French Army of the Moselle during the French Revolutionary Wars. He joined the French Royal Army in 1776 and was badly wounded in the American Revolutionary War two years later. After leaving military service, he married and took over the family business. At the time of the French Revolution he was elected second in command of a volunteer battalion. He was rapidly promoted, emerging as a general officer in May 1793. After another promotion, he led a corps at Pirmasens and a division at Wissembourg. He was appointed commander of the Army of the Moselle in June 1794. In November he was sent with three divisions to invest the fortress of Luxembourg. He caught a fever and died during the Siege of Luxembourg. His surname is one of the names inscribed under the Arc de Triomphe.

== Early career ==
Moreaux was born at Rocroi on 14 March 1758 to parents Geoffroy Moreaux (1709–1767) and Marie Mangin (1710–1786). He had four siblings, Pierre, Marie (1745–1791), Nicole and Marie Catharine. After a short stint in the Royal Marine, Moreaux enlisted in the Auxerrois Grenadier Regiment in 1776 and was sent overseas to fight in the American Revolutionary War. During the British Capture of St. Lucia in December 1778, his leg was broken by a musket ball. Returning home to civilian life he took over the family business. On 11 February 1782 he married Marie Françoise Collardeau (b. 1760) of a well-to-do family. The couple had five children, Marie Thérèse, Charles François, Charles Florent, Pierre Victor René and Armand. The business prospered and he was soon directing 30 workers.

== Revolution ==
At the outbreak of the French Revolution Moreaux was elected commander of the Rocroi National Guard. With war threatening, the government called out the National Guard on 22 July 1791. Recognized for his organizational talents, Moreaux was made second-in-command of the 1st Battalion of the Ardennes Volunteers. His father-in-law replaced him in command of the Rocroi National Guard while his brother-in-law took over the family business. He participated in the defense of Thionville with the rank of lieutenant colonel. Between 3 and 5 September 1792, a garrison of 3,000 to 4,000 French soldiers successfully held Thionville against 20,000 Austrians and Émigrés under Friedrich Wilhelm, Fürst zu Hohenlohe-Kirchberg. The attacking force included a French Royalist unit called the Brigade of Auxerrois. Moreaux was promoted general of brigade on 15 May 1793, skipping over the rank of colonel.

Moreaux served in the campaign to capture the Fortress of Mainz which ended in failure at the Siege of Mainz. On 30 July 1793 he received promotion to the rank of general of division. He was appointed to command the Corps of the Vosges which occupied the Electorate of Trier. On 20 August, three battalions, six squadrons and 10 guns belonging to the Corps of the Vosges were defeated near the Lines of Weissenburg by a Coalition force numbering five battalions, six companies, 13 squadrons and 12 guns. The French commander Louis-Théobald Ihler was killed in the action. Out of 3,000 soldiers, the French lost 103 men and five guns captured plus an unknown number of killed and wounded. The Coalition sustained 147 casualties.

In the Battle of Pirmasens on 14 September, Moreaux was defeated by a Prussian army under Charles William Ferdinand, Duke of Brunswick-Wolfenbüttel. The name of the French commander of the Corps of the Vosges is spelled "Moreau" in historian Digby Smith's account. Another authority, Ramsay Weston Phipps noted that Moreaux was often spelled "Moreau" and confused with the more famous Jean Victor Marie Moreau. In fact, Jean Victor Moreau was not promoted to general of division until 14 April 1794. Moreaux led 12,000 men to attack the Prussian camp at Pirmasens. The Prussians were on the alert and prepared to defend themselves in strong positions. The French generals expressed doubt about continuing, but the representatives on mission demanded an assault. Accordingly, the French attacked along three valleys and were repulsed by heavy flanking fire. The French lost 4,000 casualties and 22 guns. The Prussians reported only 167 casualties.

On 30 September 1793 Moreaux was offered command of the Army of the Moselle but refused. In the Second Battle of Wissembourg in December 1793, Moreaux led a division in Lazare Hoche's Army of the Moselle. His division included the 1st Battalions of the 30th, 44th and 81st Line Infantry Demi Brigades and the Lot and Ardennes Volunteers, the 2nd Battalions of the 54th Line, 99th Line and Loiret, the 4th and 6th Battalions of the Haute-Saone, the 5th Battalion of the Orne, three squadrons of the 10th Cavalry and four squadrons of the 9th Chasseurs à Cheval Regiments. When Hoche became ill at the end of January 1794, Moreaux temporarily took command. Two months later Jean-Baptiste Jourdan succeeded Hoche in command and the army pulled back to a position between Thionville and Sarrebruck.

== Army command ==
On 25 June 1794, Moreaux was named commander of the Army of the Moselle, taking over from Claude Ignace François Michaud. In July his army captured Trier and on 23 October it captured Koblenz. Meanwhile, after a series of stunning victories, the army of Jean-Charles Pichegru conquered Flanders while Jourdan's Army of Sambre-et-Meuse advanced through Liège and Aachen to capture Bonn and Cologne. To the south, the Army of the Rhine captured Kaiserslautern and Worms. French armies stood victorious in the Netherlands and on the west bank of the Rhine. One of Moreaux's divisions led by Rémy Vincent captured Rheinfels Castle on 2 November leaving only Mainz and Luxembourg City in enemy hands on the Rhine's west bank.

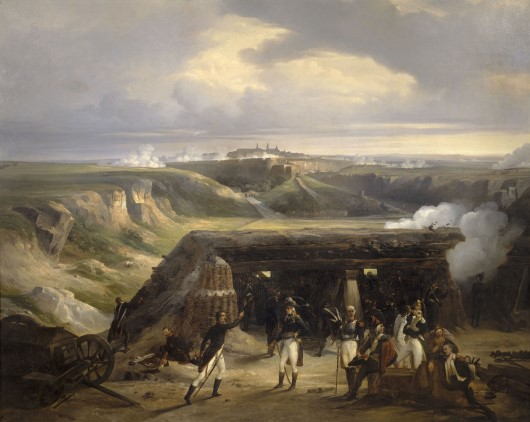
Siege of Luxembourg 1794–1795 by Renoux

While Michaud's Army of the Rhine received instructions to lay siege to Mainz, Moreaux was ordered to make preparations to capture Luxembourg. The fortress had served the Habsburg Austrians as a major supply base during their military operations against France. Seizing Luxembourg was expected to yield enormous stocks of accumulated military supplies. Since the nearest enemy army was far away on the opposite bank of the Rhine, there was little risk that the Allies might relieve the city. For this mission, Moreaux assembled 19,800 soldiers in the divisions of Jean-Jacques Ambert, Jean-Baptiste Debrun and Guillaume Péduchelle. These were formed into two columns, including one under Debrun which approached on the Liège road starting on 19 November 1794.

Several clashes ensued between the advancing French and the withdrawing Austrians, one in which future marshal of France Louis-Nicolas Davout was involved. A blockade was established by 21 November and Moreaux's force was renamed the Army before Luxembourg. Moreaux placed Alexandre Camille Taponier's division across the road to Trier, with its right at Dommeldange and its headquarters at Sandweiler. Debrun's division covered the Arlon road with its right on the Longwy road and its left on the Liège road. Ambert's division was posted at Roeser covering the Thionville road with its headquarters at Hesperange. Moreaux located the army headquarters at Weiler-la-Tour. Achille Grigny was his chief of staff and Jean Pierre Alexandre Dieudel commanded the artillery.

The winter of 1794–1795 was bitterly cold, reaching −20 °C (−4 °F) at one point. Because the roads were in poor condition, it took several weeks before provision convoys began reaching the French camps with regularity. Arrangements were made to bake bread at Grevenmacher and convoy it to the siege lines. Moreaux requested reinforcements in order to tighten the blockade and by 15 December the Army before Luxembourg numbered 25,500 men. In addition, the Army of Sambre-et-Meuse took over positions on the west bank of the Rhine that were formerly the responsibility of the Army of the Moselle. French pickets were pushed to within 300 yards (274 m) of the Luxembourg defenses.

The 12,000-man Luxembourg garrison was commanded by the octogenarian Feldmarschall Johann von Bender. The fortress commandant was Johann Wilhelm von Schröder and the brigade commanders were Karl Philipp Sebottendorf, Johann von Moitelle and Ernst Beust. The garrison consisted of 10,095 infantry, 670 cavalry, 570 gunners, 88 sappers, 16 engineers and 415 volunteers. Altogether, there were nine Austrian infantry battalions, two battalions of Würzburgers and four squadrons of Austrian cavalry. On 9 January 1795, the garrison mounted a sortie by 3,000 picked volunteers in order to procure firewood from the surrounding villages. The blow fell on the French lines between Merl and Fayencerie. At first the Austrians drove back the besiegers but they were thrown back into Luxembourg by French reinforcements and an artillery piece that Davout brought forward. In this skirmish, the French suffered 11 killed and 25 wounded while the Austrians lost 30 killed, a number of wounded and five cavalrymen taken prisoner.

At the beginning of February, Moreaux was stricken by a fever at his headquarters at Weiler-la-Tour. He was taken to Thionville where he died on the night of 9–10 February 1795. MOREAUX is one of the names inscribed under the Arc de Triomphe, on Column 13.

On 2 February, representative on mission Étienne Neveu appointed Ambert commander of the Army before Luxembourg. At the end of March, Jacques Maurice Hatry was ordered to undertake the siege with three fresh divisions from the Army of Sambre-et-Meuse. In mid-April, the exchange of troops was carried out and the original three divisions were relieved. Bender surrendered the city on 7 June 1795.

== Notes ==
Military offices
| Preceded by Jean-Baptiste Jourdan | Commander-in-Chief of the Army of the Moselle; 2 July 1794 – 9 February 1795 | Succeeded by Jean-Jacques Ambert |
