= Siege of Luxembourg =

Siege of Luxembourg may refer to

- Siege of Luxembourg (1794–95)
- Siege of Luxembourg (1684)
