= Battle of Pirmasens =

Battle of the War of the First Coalition

Coordinates: 49°12′N 7°36′E

- Part of War of the First Coalition
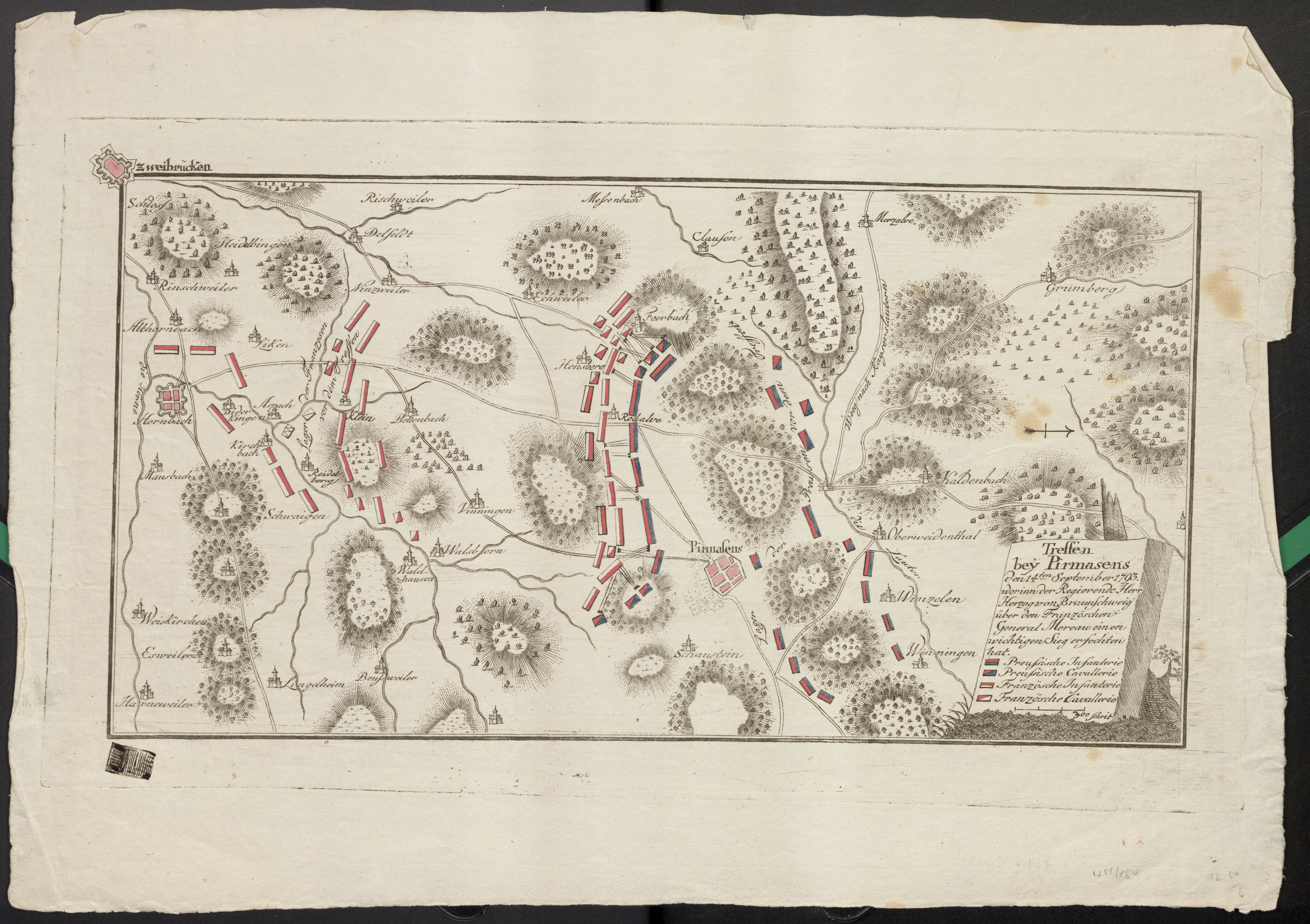
- Troop movements during the battle of Pirmasens 1793
Date	14 September 1793
Location	Pirmasens, Landgraviate of Hesse-Darmstadt, modern-day Germany
Result	Prussian victory

Belligerents
Kingdom of Prussia	(French First Republic) Republican France

Commanders and leaders
(Kingdom of Prussia) Duke of Brunswick	(French First Republic) Jean René Moreaux

Units involved
(Kingdom of Prussia) Prussian Army	(French First Republic) Corps of the Vosges

Strength
8,000, 58 guns	12,000, 36 guns

Casualties and losses
167	4,000, 19–22 guns

The Battle of Pirmasens (14 September 1793) saw the French Republican corps led by Jean René Moreaux attack the Prussian force led by Charles William Ferdinand, Duke of Brunswick-Wolfenbüttel. From prepared positions, the Prussians caught the French in a deadly crossfire, forcing them to withdraw their troops. The clash happened during the War of the First Coalition, part of a larger conflict known as the French Revolutionary Wars. In 1793 Pirmasens was part of the Landgraviate of Hesse-Darmstadt but today the city is in the state of Rhineland-Palatinate in Germany, 34.4 kilometres (21 mi) south of Kaiserslautern.

== Battle ==
The 8,000-strong Prussian force counted 11 battalions, 11 squadrons, one horse and five foot artillery batteries. One wing was led by General-Leutnant Ludwig Karl von Kalckstein and consisted of the 2nd and 3rd Battalions of the Garde zu Fuss Infantry Regiment Nr. 15 and three battalions each of the Infantry Regiments Brunswick Nr. 19 and Prinz Heinrich Nr. 35. The other wing was under General-major Prince Charles Louis of Baden and included the 1st Battalions of the Infantry Regiments Schladen Nr. 41 and Borch Nr. 49, 2nd Battalion of Infantry Regiment Wolframsdorf Nr. 37, four squadrons of the Borstell Cuirassier Regiment Nr. 7, five squadrons of the Tschirschky Dragoon Regiment Nr. 11 and two squadrons of the Wolffradt Hussar Regiment Nr. 6. The Prussian force was supported by 58 artillery pieces.

Moreaux's attacking force was divided into three columns. The Right Column was led by Paul Guillaume and included the 1st Battalion of the 30th Line Infantry Demi Brigade, 2nd Battalion of the 8th Line, 4th Battalion of the Haute-Saône Volunteers and 270 men of the Guillaume Company. The Center Column was directed by François Xavier Jacob Freytag and consisted of the 1st Battalions of the 1st, 24th, 96th and 102nd Line and Yonne Volunteers, 2nd Battalions of the Moselle and Observatoire Volunteers, 3rd Battalion of the République Volunteers, 3rd and 4th Battalions of the Manche Volunteers, 4th Battalion of the Seine-Inférieure Volunteers, 9th Battalion of the Meurthe Volunteers, the Bons-Tireurs Chasseurs Company and three squadrons of the 4th Cavalry Regiment. The Left Column was under Louis Lequoy and counted six squadrons of the 9th Chasseurs à Cheval and 14th Dragoon Regiments. The French were provided with 36 guns.
