= Siege of Luxembourg (1794–1795) =

1794–1795 siege during the War of the First Coalition

- Part of the Flanders campaign in the War of the First Coalition
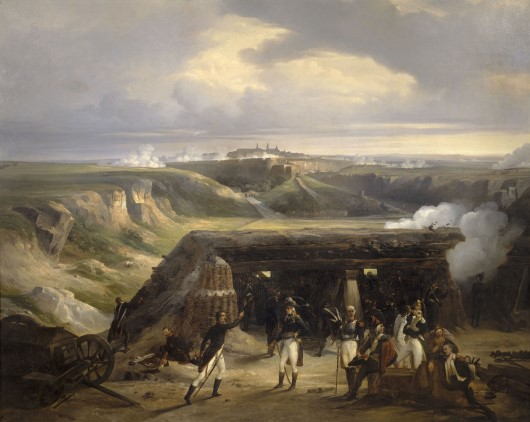
- Siège de Luxembourg 1794-1795 by Charles-Caïus Renoux
Date	22 November 1794 – 7 June 1795
Location	Luxembourg City, Southern Netherlands (present-day Luxembourg) 49.611°N 6.133°E
Result	French victory

Belligerents
(France) French First Republic	Habsburg monarchy

Commanders and leaders
(France) Jean René Moreaux (France) Jean-Jacques Ambert (France) Jacques Maurice Hatry	(Habsburg monarchy) Blasius Columban Freiherr von Bender

Strength
25,500 to 39,000	15,000

Casualties and losses
Unknown	1,200 dead and wounded, 12,396 captured, 819 guns captured
- Location within Europe

The siege of Luxembourg was a siege by France of the Habsburg-held Fortress of Luxembourg that lasted from 1794 until 7 June 1795, during the French Revolutionary Wars. Although the French army failed to breach the walls of the city, which were renowned as amongst the best in the world, the fortress was forced to surrender after more than seven months.

Luxembourg's long defence led Lazare Carnot to call Luxembourg "the best [fortress] in the world, except Gibraltar", giving rise to the city's nickname 'the Gibraltar of the North'.

The result of the capture of Luxembourg was the annexation of the Southern Netherlands into France on 1 October 1795. Most of Luxembourg (including all of the modern Grand Duchy), became a part of the département of Forêts, which was created on 24 October 1795.

== Background ==
After taking Rheinfels Castle, the French were masters of the left bank of the Rhine, with the exception of the fortresses of Mainz and Luxembourg. The Committee of Public Safety therefore ordered that both of these should be conquered.

The Army of the Rhine, commanded by General Claude Ignace François Michaud, attacked Mainz, while the Army of the Moselle under Jean René Moreaux dealt with Luxembourg. The French were particularly eager to take this city as they were hoping to find large stocks of provisions and war materials, which they were lacking.

82-year old Field Marshal Baron Blasius Columban Freiherr von Bender was the governor of Luxembourg, and the commander of the city was Field Marshal-Lieutenant Johann Wilhelm von Schroder. 15,000 were garrisoned in the city, which was also defended by 500 guns, cannons, mortars and howitzers.

== Prelude ==
On 19 November 1794, the two companies of the 5th Dragoon Regiment which made up the vanguard of the division of General Jean-Baptiste Debrun were met around Liège by a large Austrian contingent of 1,500 infantrymen and 400 cavalry, which they defeated despite their numerical inferiority.

On 21 November, on the edge of the forest of Grünewald, Debrun's division encountered an Austrian outpost of 400 infantrymen, 300 Hussars and 6 artillery pieces. The brigade of General Guillaume Péduchelle pursued the enemy up to the reach of the cannons of Luxembourg. The confrontation, started at 11:30, lasted until nightfall, and ended in a victory for the French, who captured 4 cannons and their caissons.

== Siege ==
The commander-in-chief, General of Division Jean René Moreaux, arrived on 22 November and deployed his three divisions around the city. Alexandre Camille Taponier's division occupied the road to Trier; Debrun's division took the road to Arlon; the third was on the road to Thionville; the reserve was in Frisange.

The artillery of the city engaged in intense firing on anything that was within range. The soldiers of the Army of the Moselle suffered from the hardships of winter, and lacked supplies. Often, half the men were not at their posts, but were busy pillaging the neighbouring villages to find food. In late January 1795, General Moreaux requested Field Marshal Bender to surrender honourably, but this was declined.

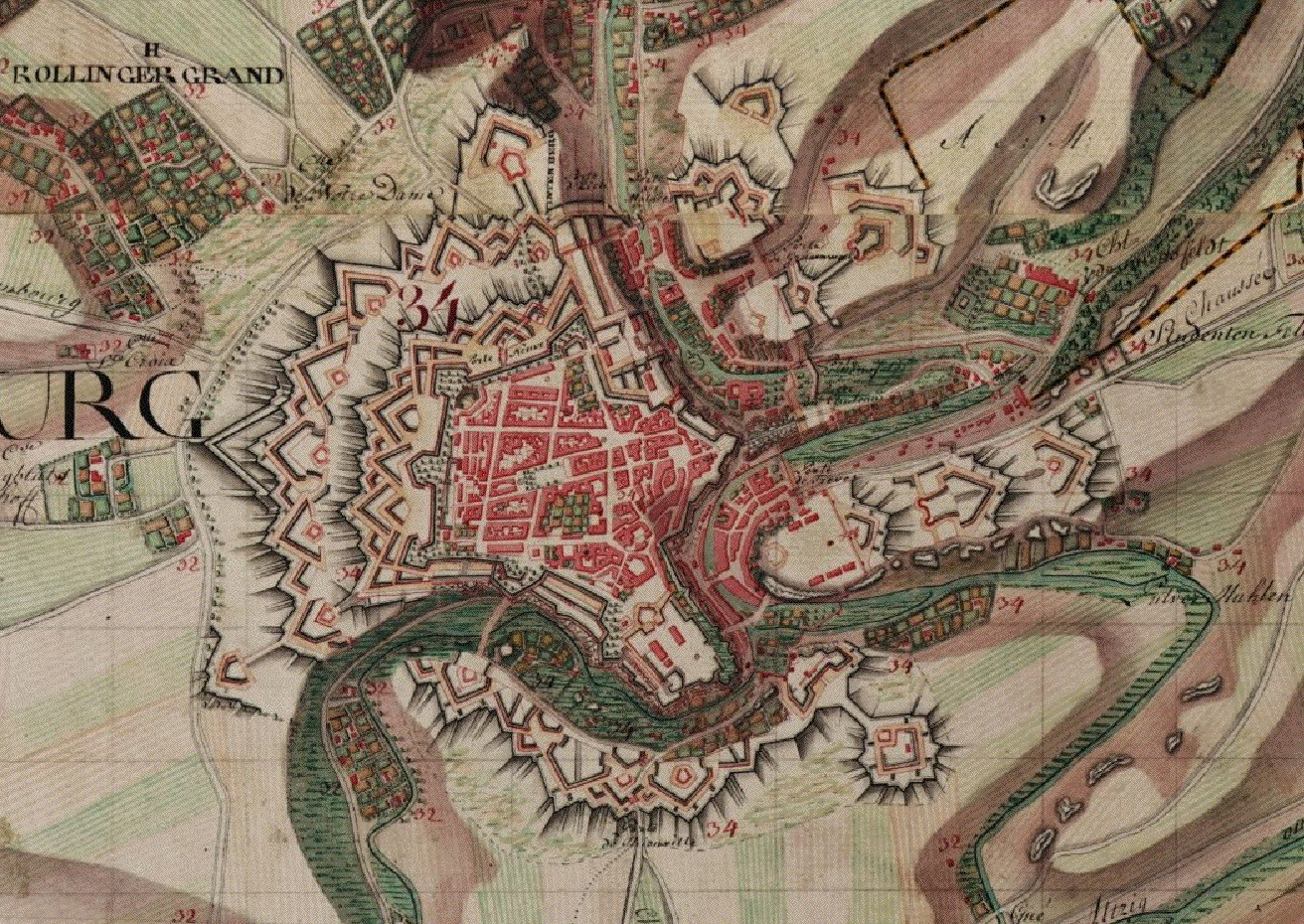
Luxembourg fortress in 1775 by Joseph de Ferraris

Unable to allow themselves to pillage like their soldiers, the officers also suffered from hunger. Moreaux fell ill and had to be evacuated to Thionville, where he died in the night of 10 February. Command now passed to General of Division Jean-Jacques Ambert, but the Committee of Public Safety, in order to put an end to the siege of Mainz, decided to send the three divisions of the Army of the Moselle and a new commander to replace the Army of the Rhine.

The Army of the Rhine's place would be taken by three divisions of the Army of Sambre-et-Meuse under Generals of Division Anne Charles Basset Montaigu, Jean Antoine Chapsal and Jacques Desjardin. The artillery was entrusted to François Chonet de Bollemont, while General of Division Jacques Maurice Hatry became Commander-in-Chief. Montaigu's 3rd Division counted 7,903 infantry, 1,374 cavalry, 240 gunners and 394 sappers. The 1st Brigade under Louis Adrien Théodore Thory consisted of the 89th and 162nd Line Infantry Demi Brigades while Claude Lecourbe's 2nd Brigade was made up of the 32nd and 178th Line. The mounted contingent had the 15th and 23rd Cavalry Regiments. Chapsal's 4th Division included 12,451 foot soldiers, 917 horsemen, 542 artillerists and 197 engineers. The 1st Brigade of Bernard Étienne Marie Duvignau had the 33rd and 49th Line while Louis Friant's 2nd Brigade comprised the 97th and 138th Line and the 21st Light. The 4th Cavalry Regiment was attached. Desjardin's 8th Division numbered 12,972 infantry, 682 cavalry, 205 gunners and 188 sappers. The 1st Brigade under Jean-Baptiste Rivet was composed of the 53rd and 87th Line and the 1st Battalion of the Sarthe Volunteers and the 5th Battalion of the Yonne while Nicolas Soult's 2nd Brigade consisted of the 66th and 116th Line. The 8th Division's mounted unit was the 7th Cavalry Regiment. By mid-May 1795 there were nearly 39,000 Frenchmen besieging the city.

The two armies crossed on 20 March. Witnessing these movements, those inside the city thought that the French were lifting the siege, and engaged in several sorties to harass them, but were repulsed.

In the last days of April, General Hatry renewed the offer for the city to surrender, but this was declined again. He then started constructing a shielded battery on a nearby height, equipped with mortars, in order to bombard the city. Faced with this threat, the Austrians attempted a massive sortie on the night of 15 to 16 May, but were repulsed with heavy losses. Now convinced of the futility of such actions, the governor ordered the continuous bombardment of the French artillery positions. The firing lasted 12 days, but the French batteries retaliated and caused numerous casualties, to the extent that the residents asked Bender to capitulate.

On 1 June, an envoy was sent to General Hatry, and on 7 June, the capitulation was signed at the French headquarters in Itzig. On 12 June, the 12,396 men still making up the garrison, left with the honours of war in front of 11,000 French soldiers. The last Austrian column was mostly composed of Belgian and Walloon soldiers, who laid down their arms, refused to follow the Austrians, and asked to serve France.

The French made a triumphal entry into the city; their first act was to plant a "tree of liberty" on the Place d'Armes.

== Consequences ==
As they had hoped, the French captured a large amount of war material: 819 cannons, 16,244 firearms, 4,500 sabres, 336,857 cannonballs, 47,801 bombs, 114,704 grenades, and 1,033,153 pounds of powder.

The capture of the Fortress of Luxembourg allowed the French Republic's annexation of the Southern Low Countries. On 1 October 1795, most of Luxembourg became part of the Département des Forêts, created on 24 October 1795. Only the left bank of the Rhine, Mainz, now remained.

== References and further reading ==
- Atten, Alain (1995). "Die Post des Feldmarschalls" (PDF). Ons Stad (in German) (49): 12–14.
- Kreins, Jean-Marie (2003). Histoire du Luxembourg (in French) (3rd ed.). Paris: Presses Universitaires de France. ISBN 978-2-13-053852-3.

Preceded by Battle of Aldenhoven (1794)	French Revolution: Revolutionary campaigns Siege of Luxembourg (1794–1795)	Succeeded by Peace of Basel
