= Army of the Centre =

French revolutionary army

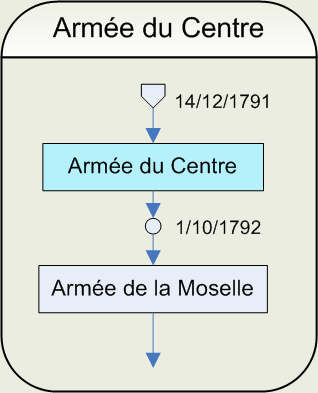
Evolution of the Army of the Centre

The Army of the Centre (armée du Centre) was one of the first French Revolutionary Armies, named after the location it was set up, the Centre region. It was established by the order of King Louis XVI on 14 December 1791 and attached to Champagne. It had only an ephemeral existence after the Battle of Valmy and the Prussians' evacuation of the territory.

Its name reflects its position occupying the centre of the French order of battle on the northern and eastern frontiers, between the armée du Nord and armée du Rhin, the 3rd and 4th military divisions on their creation, then also the 2nd division from 23 March.

By a National Convention decree of 1 October 1792, it was renamed the armée de la Moselle, but remained known as the armée du Centre whilst Kellermann was at its head (i.e. until 7 November 1792).

== Generals ==
- 14 December 1791 - 11 July 1792 : général La Fayette
- 12 July - 1 September 1792 : maréchal Luckner, as part of his supreme command of the armée du Rhin
- 2 September - 7 November 1792 : général Kellermann, subordinated to général Dumouriez to leave 19 September.

== Sources ==
- C. Clerget : Tableaux des armées françaises pendant les guerres de la Révolution (Librairie militaire 1905);
