= Battle of Biesingen =

Battle of the War of the First Coalition

Coordinates: 49°13′16″N 07°12′19″E

- Part of the War of the First Coalition
Date	17 November 1793
Location	Biesingen
Result	Prussian victory

Belligerents
(French First Republic) Republican France	Kingdom of Prussia

Commanders and leaders
Louis-Lazare Hoche	Friedrich Adolf von Kalckreuth

Strength
from 20,000 to 25,000	from 7,000 to 13,000

Casualties and losses
about 800 – 1,000	about 160 dead and several wounded

The Battle of Biesingen took place during the War of the First Coalition on 17 November 1793 at Biesingen, now a district of Blieskastel. It occurred between a Prussian force under General Friedrich Adolf von Kalckreuth and a French one (mainly new conscripts) under General Louis-Lazare Hoche, ending in a Prussian victory.

== Course ==
The French Army of the Moselle set off from its camp on the Saar in three columns on the morning of 17 November. Whilst two of the columns continued to Tholey and St. Ingbert, the third and strongest column turned towards Biesingen, where von Kalckreuth blocked the route between Biesingen and Blieskastel.

The battle opened with heavy French artillery fire against the Prussian centre on the Hilscheider heights. At the same time 800 French infantry had crossed the Blies at Blieskastel to attack the Prussian right flank, but thanks to a patrol this attempt to flank the Prussians failed. They held out until reinforcements arrived and forced the French to retreat. In an attempt to break through the Prussian left flank, general Lombard had advanced through the Hilscheider forest. After a first musket volley, the Prussians and their allies charged into a bayonet attack, with Lombard and several other French officers captured.

A third French attack followed on a hill near Wolfersheim, in which a 3,000 strong cavalry contingent penetrated the Prussian positions and – after two failed attempts – a third was briefly successful in breaking the lines and capturing several cannon. The Prussians had already formed up in line and the French had to retreat again under musket fire and against fixed bayonets. A final attack on the right wing was also cut off and so the French had to retire in the evening.

Despite his success with a small force, Kalkreuth was aware of his situation and retired to Homburg on the morning of 18 November, giving general Hoche the opportunity to announce his victory to the Directory in Paris on 19 November. The Prussians withdrew in the following days to defensive lines at Kaiserslautern.
