= Friedrich Wilhelm, Fürst zu Hohenlohe-Kirchberg =

Austrian military officer

Friedrich William von Hohenlohe-Kirchberg
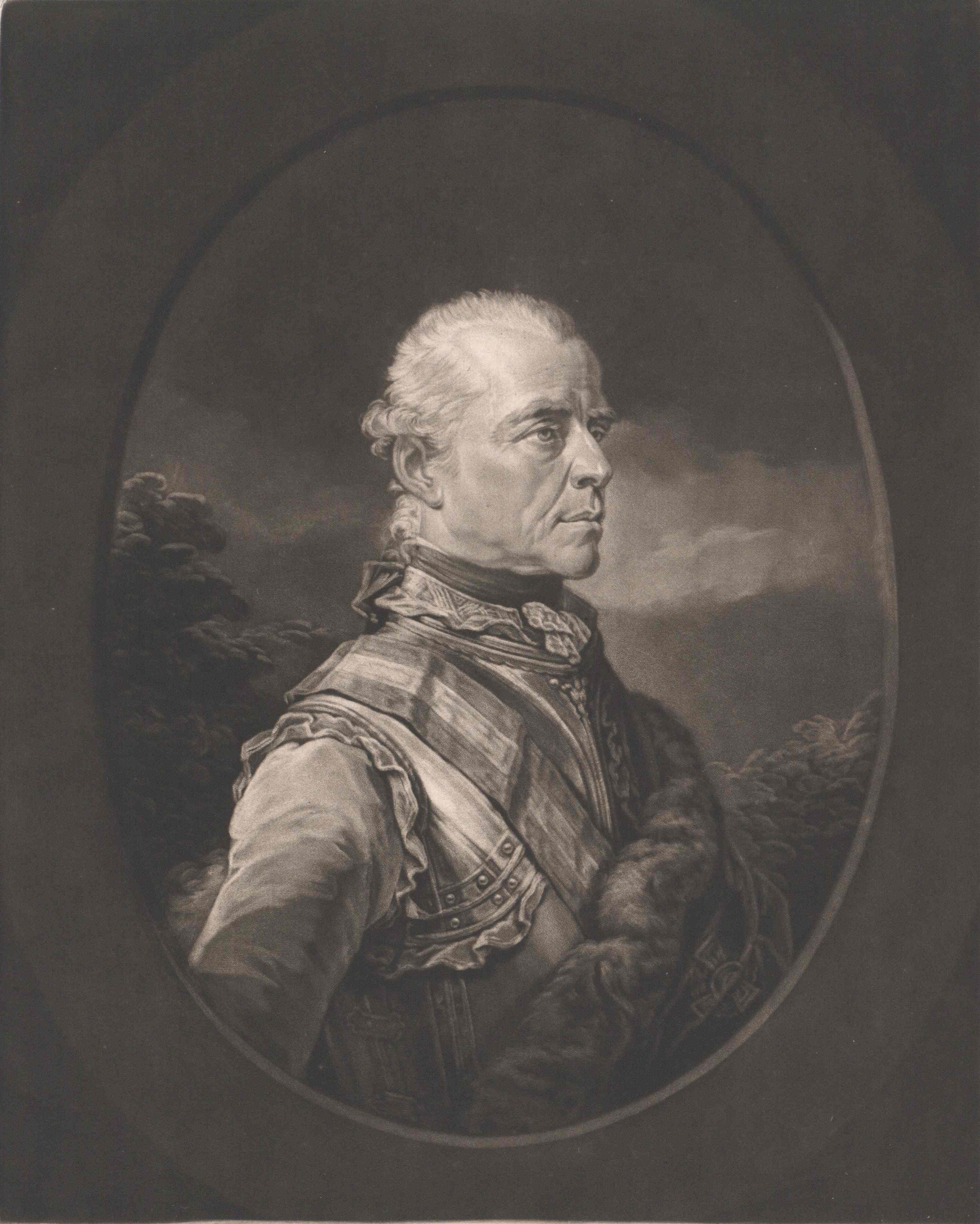
- Born: 2 December 1732; Kirchberg, Hohenlohe
- Died: 10 August 1796 (aged 63) Prague, Bohemia
- Allegiance: Habsburg Monarchy
- Service years: 1756–1795
- Rank: Colonel, Proprietor, 17th Infantry Regiment; Field Marshal
- Conflicts: Seven Years' War; War of Bavarian Succession; Russo-Turkish War of 1768-1774; Austro-Turkish War (1788–1791); French Revolutionary Wars; War of the First Coalition
- Awards: 1761, Knight's Cross of the Military Order of Maria Theresa; 1789, Commander's Cross of the Military Order of Maria Theresa; 1792, Grand Cross of the Military Order of Maria Theresa

Friedrich William, Fürst zu Hohenlohe-Kirchberg was born in Kirchberg, Hohenlohe, Holy Roman Empire (now part of Baden-Württemberg, Germany) on 2 December 1732. He was a member of an old comital and, subsequently, princely (Fürstlich) family of Hohenlohe, with extensive properties on the plateau south of the Main river, between the Imperial City of Schwäbisch Hall and the old Franconian city of Rothenburg ob der Tauber.

He had a distinguished career in the Austrian army in the Seven Years' War, the War of Bavarian Succession, and the French Revolutionary Wars. An experienced, if old-fashioned, general, he was chosen to mentor the young Archduke Charles, who was assigned to his staff during the 1792 campaign in France. From 1780 until his death, he was the Colonel-Proprietor of the 17th Infantry Regiment.

== Early career ==
Hohenlohe-Kirchberg began his military career in 1756, when he joined the Habsburg regiment, the 29th Infantry Regiment Braunschweig-Wolfenbüttel as a young man. He served as a captain of grenadiers in the Seven Years' War. He was twice wounded, first at the famous Battle of Leuthen, and later at the Battle of Landshut, during the storming of Prussian redoubts. In 1758, he was promoted to major, in 1761, to lieutenant colonel, and in 1764, to colonel.

He served under Gideon von Laudon in the short War of the Bavarian Succession, also called the Potato War for its lack of battles but its intense raiding of the enemy's food supplies. After this conflict, which took place in Bohemia (present-day Czech Republic), he was promoted to Lieutenant Field Marshal (Feldmarschal-Leutnant) and served in the Austro-Turkish War, again under the command of von Laudon. He orchestrated the Austrian victory over the Turks at Persenji. After the Walachia campaign, he received the Commander's Cross of the Military Order of Maria Theresa and was appointed as Colonel-Proprietor (Inhaber) of the 17th Infantry Regiment, a position he held until his death in 1796. On 15 October 1789, he was promoted again, to general of infantry, or Feldzeugmeister, and appointed as Commanding General in Transylvania, in the so-called Siebenbürgen.

== French Revolutionary Wars ==
In 1792, he was initially placed in command of the 50,000 Austrian forces in the Upper Rhine Valley. In August, his forces crossed the Rhine by Mannheim, and participated in the bombardment of Thionville, on the Moselle, in early September. Although the invading forces of the allies readily captured Longwy on 23 August and slowly marched on to Verdun, which was even less defensible than Longwy. The Duke of Brunswick now began his march on Paris and approached the defiles of the Argonne. In combination with the Army of Condé and Hessian troops, a portion of his force, 15,000, covered the left (southern) flank of the Prussian advance on Valmy.

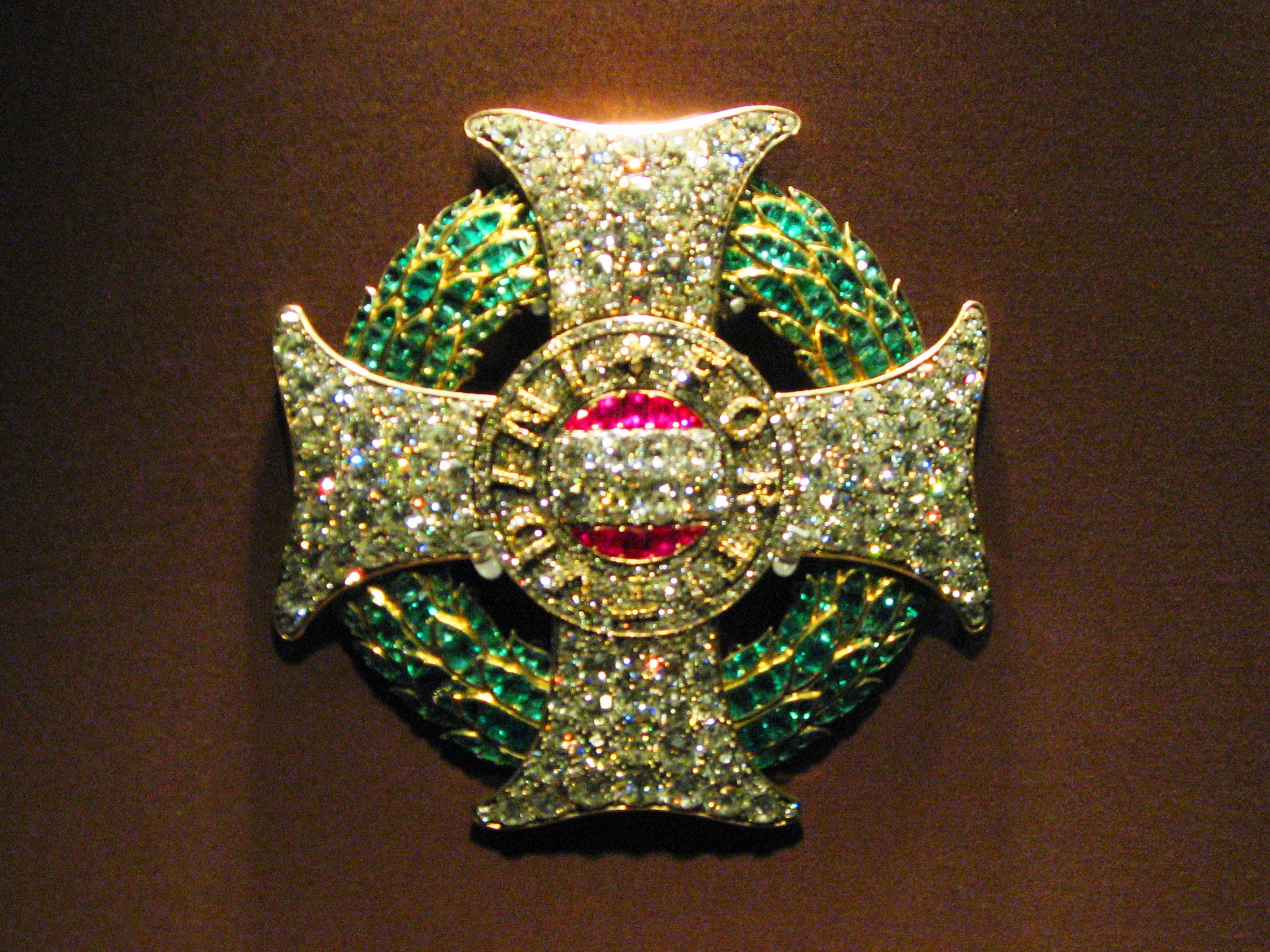
Grand Cross of the Military Order of Maria Theresa, awarded to Hohenlohe-Kirchberg in 1792

As a seasoned and experienced officer, he had been chosen as a mentor for the young Archduke Charles, and the archduke was assigned to his force; they were not at Valmy, but could hear the cannonade. The Duke of Brunswick's force was to engage the northern flank of the French army, called the Army of the Sedan, while Hohenlohe-Kirchberg's force engaged the southern flank (Army of the Metz).

In December 1792, Hohenlohe-Kirchberg's forces defended Trier from the Army of the Moselle so well that its commander, General of Division Pierre de Ruel, marquis de Beurnonville, was removed from his command by his superiors in Paris. On 31 December, Hohenlohe-Kirchberg was awarded the Grand Cross of Military Order of Maria Theresa for his success at Trier.

Promotions

- Major: 1758
- Lt. Colonel: 1761
- Colonel: 1764
- Major General: 8 January 1770 (effective 23 December 1769)
- Lieutenant Field Marshal: 10 April 1783 (effective 24 April 1783)
- General of Infantry: 15 October 1789

In May 1793, his forces played a decisive role in the victory at the Battle of Famars. He was appointed as General Quarter Master and Chief of Staff to the Coalition's main army in Flanders, succeeding General Karl Mack. As part of the Belgian Corps under Field Marshal Saxe-Coburg-Saalfeld he played a decisive role in the action at Avesnes-le-Sec and later at the Battle of Fleurus (1794). Subsequently, Hohenlohe-Kirchberg commanded a corps on the upper Rhine and was responsible for the recapture of Speyer from the French on 17 September 1794. This was his final military action; he retired from service in early 1795 because of his failing health and died in 1796.

== Family ==
Born in the family county of Hohenlohe, Friedrich Wilhelm (William) was the first son of Karl August, Fürst zu Hohenlohe-Kirchberg and his second wife, Susanne Margarete Louisa, Gräfin von Auersperg. Eight other children followed until her death 12 September 1748. His father remarried (21 January 1749) and had four more children. In 1770, Friedrich Wilhelm married the divorced Frederike, Countess of Reuss zu Greiz (Greiz 9 July 1750 – Prague 14 June 1816); they had no children. He died in Prague, Bohemia, 10 August 1796.

Ancestry

Friedrich Eberhard von Hohenlohe-Kirchberg (Langenburg, 24 November 1672 – 23 August 1737 Kirchberg); Graf von Hohenlohe-Kirchberg House of Hohenlohe-Langenburg
Karl August, Prince of Hohenlohe-Gleichen (6 April 1707 – 17 May 1767); Fürst zu Hohenlohe-Gleichen, Graf zu Kirchberg
Friederike Albertine von Erbach-Fürstenau House of Erbach-Fürstenau
Friedrich Wilhelm zu Hohenlohe-Kirchberg (1732–1796)
Wolfgang Engelbert V von Auersperg (1664–1723) House of Auersperg
Susanne Margarete Luise von Auersperg (1712–1748)
Emmerentia Sophia von Auersperg (1676–1747) Auersperg

=== Sibling connections ===
Seven of his 12 siblings died before the age of ten. The surviving siblings were:

- Christian Friedrich Karl, Fürst zu Hohenlohe-Kirchberg (19 October 1729 Kirchberg – 18 August 1819 Kirchberg)
- August Ludwig, Prinz zu Hohenlohe-Kirchberg (3 September 1735 Kirchberg – 19 January or June 1780 Kirchberg)
- Friedrich Eberhard, Prinz zu Hohenlohe-Kirchberg (21 October 1737 Kirchberg – 21 January 1804 Kirchberg) (married Albertina Renata von Castell-Remlingen)
- Friedrich Karl Ludwig, Prinz zu Hohenlohe-Kirchberg (19 March/November 1751 Kirchberg – 12 September 1791 Weikersheim)

Friedrich Karl Ludwig was an amateur artist. He had started a career in cavalry but an accident during a review caused him to abandon the military. He studied first under Valentine Tischbein and later under Oeser in Leipzig. His artistic pursuits included drawing, miniature painting (at which he was apparently quite good), and ivory carving.

- Christiane Friederike Sophie zu Hohenlohe-Kirchberg (1 April 1731 – 15 March 1787)

== Sources ==
=== Bibliography ===
- Bryan, Michael. Dictionary of painters and engravers: biographical and critical, London: G Bell, 1915, B000879DH6
- Dill, Marshall. Germany: a modern history. Ann Arbor: University of Michigan Press, 1970,
- (in German) Ebert, Jens-Florian, "Friedrich William von Hohenlohe-Kirchberg." In Die Österreichischen Generalität 1792-1815. Accessed 15 October 2009.
- Eysturlid, Lee W. The Formative Influences, Theories, and Campaigns of the Archduke Carl of Austria, Contributions in Military Studies Series, volume 202. Connecticut: Greenwood Publishing Group, 2000, 9780313309960
- (in German) Genealogisches Handbuch des Adels – Fürstliche Häuser, Band 3. Glücksburg: 1955.
- Kudrna, Leopold & Digby Smith. A biographical dictionary of all Austrian Generals in the French Revolutionary and Napoleonic Wars, 1792-1815.. At Napoleon Series, Robert Burnham, editor in chief. April 2008 version. Accessed 19 October 2009.
- Lefebvre, Georges. The French Revolution, New York: Columbia University Press, 1976, 9780231085984
- (in German) Legl, F. Studien zur Geschichte der Grafen von Dagsburg-Egisheim. Saarbrücken: SDV, Saarbrücker Dr. und Verl., 1998.
- (in German) Wember, Karl. Ahnentafel Hohenlohe Langenburg Kirchberg. October 2009 version. Accessed 27 October 2009.
