= Claude Ignace François Michaud =

French soldier

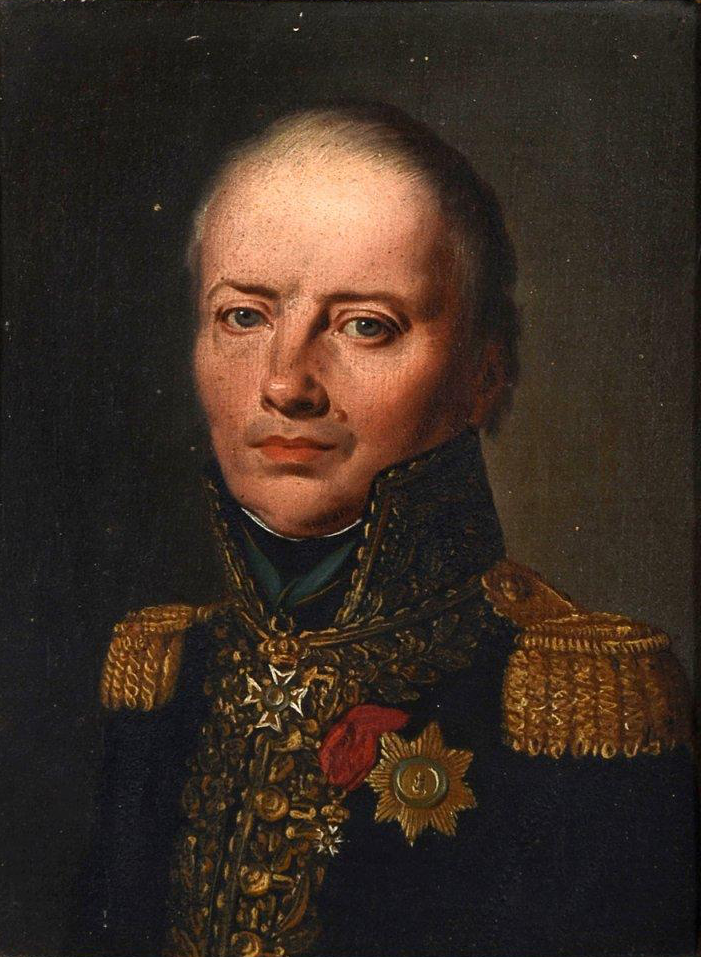
- Portrait by Louis-Léopold Boilly
- Born: 28 October 1751; Chaux-Neuve, France
- Died: 19 October 1835 (aged 83) Luzancy, Île de France, France
- Allegiance: Kingdom of France; France
- Branch: Cavalry
- Service years: (Kingdom of France) 1780–1783 (France) 1791–1814
- Rank: General of Division
- Conflicts: French Revolutionary Wars; First Battle of Wissembourg; Battle of Haguenau; Second Battle of Wissembourg; Battle of Schifferstadt; Battle of Trippstadt; Siege of Mainz; Battle of Pozzolo
- Awards: Legion d'Honneur, CC 1804

Claude Ignace François Michaud (28 October 1751 – 19 October 1835) commanded French troops during the French Revolutionary Wars, rising to command the Army of the Rhine in 1794. After serving in a cavalry regiment from 1780 to 1783 he returned to civilian life. During the French Revolution he became lieutenant colonel of a volunteer battalion. In 1793 he was promoted to both general of brigade and general of division. He led a division at Haguenau and Second Wissembourg.

When Jean-Charles Pichegru was transferred to lead the Army of the North in January 1794, Michaud was elevated to army command somewhat unwillingly. That year he led the army at Schifferstadt and the Vosges. The army was consolidated with the Army of Rhin-et-Moselle in April 1795. He commanded posts in the interior until 1800 when he led troops at the Mincio in Italy. He commanded soldiers in Holland and North Germany from 1805 to 1813 during the First French Empire. He retired in 1814 and died in 1835. MICHAUD is one of the names inscribed under the Arc de Triomphe, on Column 13.
