= Army of the Moselle =

- Active: 1791–1795
- Country: (France) French First Republic
- Branch: Army
- Type: Army
- Size: Seven divisions
- Engagements: War of the First Coalition; Battle of Valmy (1792); Battle of Trier (1792); Battle of Arlon (1793); Battle of Biesingen (1793); Battle of Kaiserslautern (1793); Battle of Froeschwiller (1793); 2nd Battle of Wissembourg (1793); Battle of Arlon (1794); Battle of Lambusart (1794); Battle of Fleurus (1794); Siege of Luxembourg (1794–95)

Commanders
- Notable commanders: Gilbert du Motier, marquis de Lafayette; Nicolas Luckner; François Christophe Kellermann; Jean Nicolas Houchard; Lazare Hoche; Jean-Baptiste Jourdan; Jean René Moreaux; Jean-Jacques Ambert

The Army of the Moselle (Armée de la Moselle) was a French Revolutionary Army from 1791 through 1795. It was first known as the Army of the Centre and it fought at Valmy. In October 1792 it was renamed and subsequently fought at Trier, First Arlon, Biesingen, Kaiserslautern, Froeschwiller and Second Wissembourg. In the spring of 1794 the left wing was detached and fought at Second Arlon, Lambusart and Fleurus before being absorbed by the Army of Sambre-et-Meuse. In late 1794, the army captured Trier and initiated the Siege of Luxembourg. During the siege, the army was discontinued and its divisions were assigned to other armies.

== History ==
Originally known as the Army of the Centre, it was renamed by decree of the National Convention on 1 October 1792 and kept under that name in the decrees of 1 March and 30 April 1793. By the decree of 29 June 1794 its left wing joined with the Army of the Ardennes and the right wing of the Army of the North to form the Army of Sambre-et-Meuse.

The right wing remained under the orders of Jean René Moreaux as the Army of the Moselle. However, this new army's right wing was joined with the left wing of the Army of the Rhine by a decree of 29 November 1794 under the name of the Armée devant Mayence (Army before Mainz), while the rest of the army was named the Army before Luxembourg under Moreaux. Finally what remained of the Army of the Moselle was merged with the Army of the Rhine by a decree of 3 March 1795 (executed on 20 April) to form the Army of the Rhine and Moselle.

== Generals ==
- 14 December 1791 – 11 July 1792: Gilbert du Motier, marquis de Lafayette
- 12 July – 1 September 1792: Nicolas Luckner, with supreme command of the Army of the Rhine
- 2 September – 1 October 1792: François Christophe Kellermann, subordinate – Charles François Dumouriez until 19 September.
- 1 October – 7 November 1792: François Christophe Kellermann, commander of the new Army of the Moselle, subordinate – Charles François Dumouriez until October 5.
- 8–14 November 1792: interim – Jean Étienne Philibert de Prez de Crassier
- 15 November 1792 – 23 January 1793: Pierre Riel de Beurnonville, subordinate of Adam Philippe Custine
- 24 January – 28 March 1793: René Charles Élisabeth de Ligniville, subordinate of Adam Philippe Custine
- 29 March – 28 April 1793: Augustin Gabriel d'Aboville
- 29 April - 2 August 1793: Jean Nicolas Houchard, subordinate – Adam Philippe Custine until May 17, then moved to the high command of the Army of the Rhine
- 3 August - 29 September 1793: interim – Balthazar Alexis Henri Schauenburg
- 30 September 1793: Jean René Moreaux rejects command
- 30 September - 30 October 1793: interim – Jacques Charles René Delaunay
- 31 October 1793 - 18 March 1794: Lazare Hoche with high command of the Army of the Rhine until January 13
- 19 March - 2 June 1794: Jean-Baptiste Jourdan
- 3 June - 1 July 1794: Jean-Baptiste Jourdan commanded the armies of the Moselle, Ardennes and the right of the Army of the North, with Jean-Charles Pichegru
- 2 July 1794 - 7 July 1794: Jean René Moreaux
- 7 July - 3 August 1794: interim – Claude Ignace François Michaud
- 3 August 1794 - 9 February 1795 – Jean René Moreaux
- 10 February - 19 April 1795, intérim – Jean-Jacques Ambert.

== Composition ==
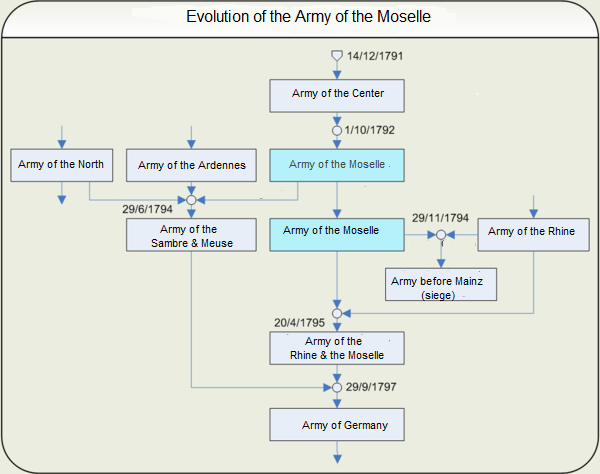
Evolution of the Army of the Moselle, War of the First Coalition

=== 1793 ===
In 1793 the Army of the Moselle counted 27 battalions of line infantry, four battalions of light infantry, 42 battalions of National Guards and 12 mounted regiments. The line infantry included the 1st and 2nd Battalions of the 30th, 33rd, 96th, 99th and 103rd Demi Brigades, the 1st Battalions of the 1st, 5th, 27th, 41st and 81st Demi Brigades and the 2nd Battalions of the 2nd, 8th, 17th, 18th, 19th, 40th, 47th, 54th, 55th, 58th, 71st and 100th Demi Brigades. The light infantry consisted of the 6th, 13th, 16th and 17th Battalions. The cavalry regiments were the 4th, 10th, 11th and 14th Cavalry, 1st, 11th and 14th Dragoons, 1st, 9th, 18th and 19th Chasseurs à Cheval and the 2nd Hussars.

The National Guards were made up of the 1st Battalions of the Ardennes, Creuse, Paris Butte de Moulins, Saône-et-Loire and Yonne, the 2nd Battalions of the Lot and Haute-Marne, the 3rd Battalions of the Côte-d'Or, Manche, Paris Sections Armée and Haut-Rhin, the 4th Battalions of the Oise and Var, the 5th Battalion of the Orne, the 6th Battalions of the Basses-Pyrénées and Seine-et-Oise, the 7th Battalion of the Marne, the 9th Battalion of Paris Ste. Margueritte, the 1st and 2nd Battalions of the Cher, 2nd and 3rd Battalions of the Loiret, the 4th, 6th and 7th Battalions of the Meurthe, the 1st, 3rd and 5th Battalions of the Meuse, the 2nd, 3rd, 4th and 5th Battalions of the Moselle, the 1st and 3rd Battalions of the Paris République, the 3rd and 4th Battalions of the Bas-Rhin, the 1st and 7th Battalions of the Rhône-et-Loire, the 1st and 4th Battalions of the Haute-Saône and the 1st and 6th Battalions of the Vosges.

=== 19 February 1794 ===
General of Division Lazare Hoche

- General of Division Jean Étienne Championnet
- General of Division Charles François Desbureaux
- General of Division Jacques Maurice Hatry
- General of Division François Joseph Lefebvre
- General of Division Jean René Moreaux
- General of Division Antoine Morlot
- General of Division Nicolas Augustin Paillard

Source: Smith, Digby (1998). The Napoleonic Wars Data Book. London: Greenhill. pp. 69–70. ISBN 1-85367-276-9.

=== 3 June 1794 ===
Army of the Moselle, Left Wing: General of Division Jean-Baptiste Jourdan

- Division Championnet: General of Division Jean Étienne Championnet (7,500)
  - General of Brigade Paul Grenier
    - 18th Line Infantry Demi Brigade (2,153 in three battalions)
    - 1st Dragoon Regiment (444 in three squadrons)
  - General of Brigade Gabriel Jacques Lerivint
    - 59th Line Infantry Demi Brigade (1,638 in three battalions)
    - 94th Line Infantry Demi Brigade (2,327 in three battalions)
    - 4th Cavalry Regiment (398 in three squadrons)
  - 2nd Light Artillery Company (90)
- Division Hatry: General of Division Jacques Maurice Hatry (10,005)
  - General of Brigade Jean Antoine Chapsal
    - 27th Line Infantry Demi Brigade (680 in 1st Battalion)
    - 44th Line Infantry Demi Brigade (768 in 1st Battalion)
    - Moselle National Guard (771 in 2nd Battalion)
    - Moselle National Guard (604 in 3rd Battalion)
    - Cote-d'Or National Guard (428 in 3rd Battalion)
    - Seine-et-Oise National Guard (1,030 in 6th Battalion)
    - Doubs National Guard (455 in 9th Battalion)
    - Meurthe National Guard (563 in 9th Battalion)
    - 11th Dragoon Regiment (420 in three squadrons)
    - 18th Chasseurs à Cheval Regiment (158 in one squadron)
  - General of Brigade Jean Pierre François Bonet
    - 33rd Line Infantry Demi Brigade (789 in 2nd Battalion)
    - 58th Line Infantry Demi Brigade (730 in 2nd Battalion)
    - Lot-et-Garonne National Guard (582 in 1st Battalion)
    - Bas-Rhin National Guard (789 in 1st Battalion)
    - Loiret National Guard (582 in 2nd Battalion)
    - Var National Guard (554 in 4th Battalion)
  - 3rd Light Artillery Company (93)
- Division Lefebvre: General of Division François Joseph Lefebvre (9,925)
  - General of Brigade Jean François Leval
    - 5th Line Infantry Demi Brigade (777 in 1st Battalion)
    - 54th Line Infantry Demi Brigade (423 in 2nd Battalion)
    - 99th Line Infantry Demi Brigade (640 in 2nd Battalion)
    - 9th Chasseurs à Cheval Regiment (341)
  - General of Brigade Jean-Baptiste Jacopin
    - 13th Line Infantry Demi Brigade (1,572 in three battalions)
    - 80th Line Infantry Demi Brigade (2,064 in three battalions)
    - 149th Line Infantry Demi Brigade (1,663 in three battalions)
  - General of Brigade Jean Sultzmann
    - 16th Light Infantry Battalion (380)
    - 1st Chasseurs à Cheval Regiment (381)
    - 18th Chasseurs à Cheval Regiment (126)
    - Légion de la Moselle (410)
    - Vosges National Guard (717 in 1st Battalion)
  - 19th Light Artillery Company (110)
- Division Morlot: General of Division Antoine Morlot (8,210)
  - General of Brigade Jean Baptiste Olivier
    - 110th Line Infantry Demi Brigade (2,709 in three battalions)
    - 14th Dragoon Regiment (445 in three squadrons)
  - General of Brigade Henri Simon
    - 1st Line Infantry Demi Brigade (2,190 in three battalions)
    - 34th Line Infantry Demi Brigade (2,354 in three battalions)
    - 10th Cavalry Regiment (416 in four squadrons)
  - 30th Light Artillery Company (96)

Source: Smith, Digby (1998). The Napoleonic Wars Data Book. London: Greenhill. p. 71. ISBN 1-85367-276-9. Brigade organization and numbers of battalions and squadrons are taken from the Fleurus order of battle on p. 86.

After 20 April 1795, this army was combined with the Army of the Rhine, forming the Army of the Rhine and Moselle.

== Sources ==
- Clerget, Charles (1905). Tableaux des armées françaises pendant les guerres de la Révolution. Paris: R. Chapelot: Section historique de l'état-major de l'armée, librairie militaire.
- Smith, Digby (1998). The Napoleonic Wars Data Book. London: Greenhill. ISBN 1-85367-276-9.
