= Second Battle of Wissembourg =

Part of the War of the First Coalition

Second Battle of Wissembourg (1793)
- Part of French Revolutionary Wars
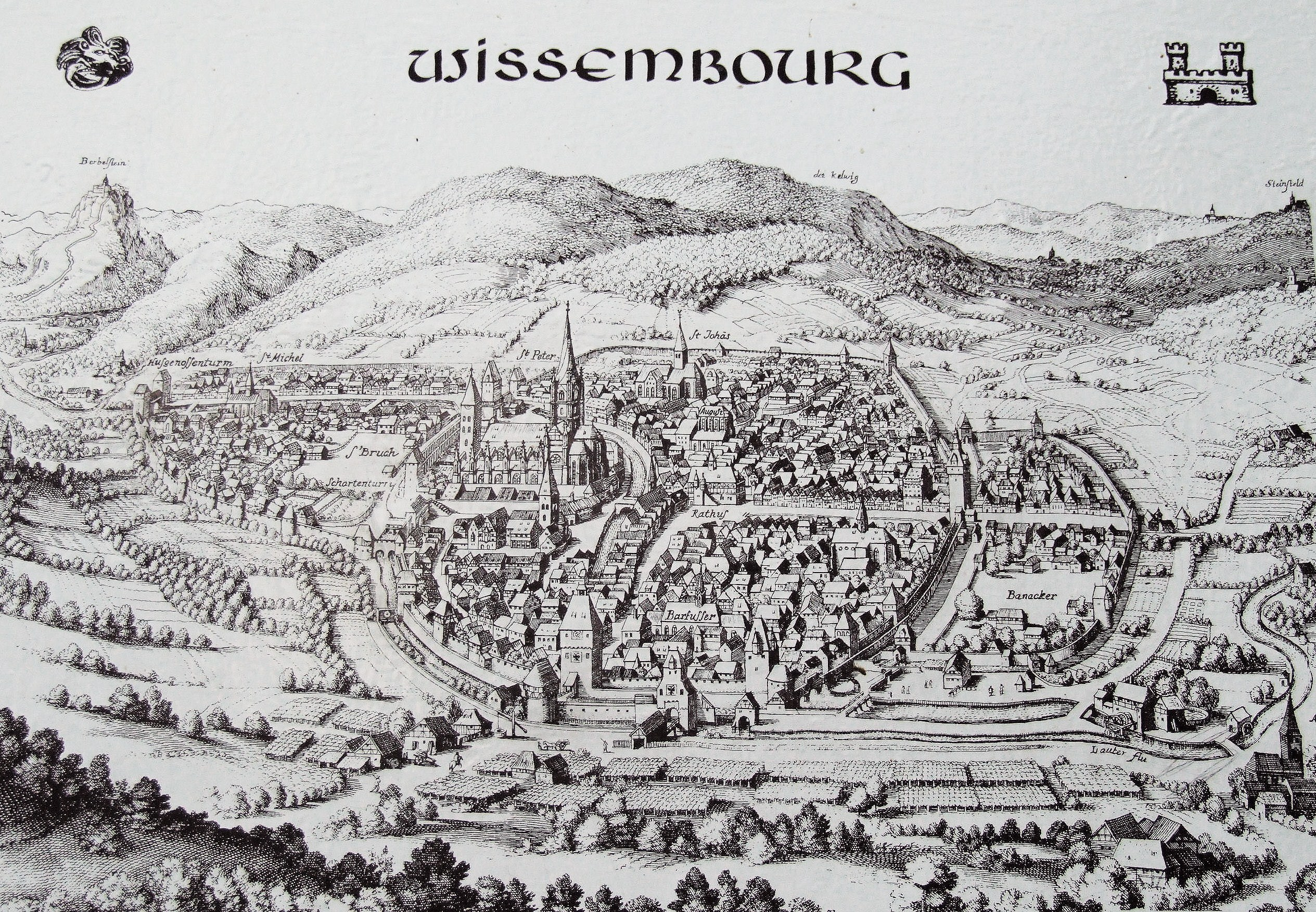
- Wissembourg in the 17th century
Date	26–29 December 1793
Location	Wissembourg, Bas-Rhin, France 49.0383°N 7.9469°E
Result	French victory

Belligerents
(French First Republic) France	(Habsburg monarchy) Austria (Kingdom of Prussia) Prussia; Electorate of Bavaria; Hesse-Kassel

Commanders and leaders
(French First Republic) Lazare Hoche (French First Republic) Charles Pichegru	(Habsburg monarchy) Dagobert Wurmser (Kingdom of Prussia) Duke of Brunswick-Wolfenbüttel (Kingdom of Prussia) Ernst von Rüchel (Electorate of Bavaria) Count Minucci

Strength
35,000	30,000

Casualties and losses
500	1,500; 21 guns
- Location within Europe

The Second Battle of Wissembourg from 26 December 1793 to 29 December 1793 saw an army of the French First Republic under General Lazare Hoche fight a series of clashes against an army of Austrians, Prussians, Bavarians, and Hessians led by two generals, namely, the Austrian Dagobert Sigmund von Wurmser and the Prussian Charles William Ferdinand, Duke of Brunswick-Wolfenbüttel. There were significant actions at Wœrth on 22 December and Geisberg on 26 and 27 December. In the end, the French forced their opponents to withdraw to the east bank of the Rhine River. The action occurred during the War of the First Coalition phase of the French Revolutionary Wars.

== Background ==
During the First Battle of Wissembourg on 13 October 1793, the Lines of Weissenburg, defended by the French Army of the Rhine, were stormed by an Austrian-Allied army under Wurmser. A month later, Austrian engineer Franz von Lauer compelled Fort-Louis on the Rhine to surrender to the Allies. The French government responded to the crisis by sending reinforcements from the Army of the Moselle.

On 17 November, the 739-man French garrison of Bitche repelled a Prussian assault on the citadel. A French traitor led the picked force of 1,200 into the outer fortifications. The alert defenders spotted Oberst (Colonel) von Wartensleben's attackers and drove them out of the fort with the loss of 120 killed and 251 captured. The French lost a handful of men killed and wounded and 63 captured. The traitor was captured and shot. That same day, Prussian General Friedrich Adolf, Count von Kalckreuth with 13,000 troops defeated Hoche's 20,000 men at Biesingen. The French lost 760 killed and wounded, plus 42 captured. Prussian losses were only 16 killed and 92 wounded.

The Battle of Kaiserslautern followed on 28 to 30 November 1793 when Hoche with 29,115 infantry, 5,046 cavalry, and 52 guns engaged Charles William Ferdinand, Duke of Brunswick-Wolfenbüttel with 26,000 Prussians and Saxons. The Allies defeated the French with a loss of 2,400 killed and wounded, plus 700 men and two guns captured. Prussian casualties numbered 616 while the Saxons lost 190 men. Following the policy of King Frederick William II, Brunswick failed to follow up his victory with a vigorous pursuit.

== Battle ==
The allies were in their turn dispossessed by Hoche on 26 December and forced to retreat behind the Rhine.

It was a French victory and enabled French forces to secure the whole of Alsace. It also led to a definitive break between the Austrians and the Prussians, who blamed each other for the defeat. The battle's name is engraved on the north pillar of the Arc de Triomphe in Paris.

== Notes ==
Preceded by Battle of Truillas	French Revolution: Revolutionary campaigns Second Battle of Wissembourg (1793)	Succeeded by Battle of Villers-en-Cauchies
