= Battle of Biberach =

Battle of Biberach may refer to:

- Battle of Biberach (1796), an action between Jean Victor Marie Moreau's French and Count Baillet de Latour's Austrians
- Battle of Biberach (1800), a battle between Laurent Gouvion Saint-Cyr's French and Pál Kray's Austrians
