= Battle of Friedberg (Bavaria) =

Battle of the War of the First Coalition

Coordinates: 48.3549°N 10.9797°E

- Part of the French Revolutionary Wars
Date	24 August 1796
Location	Friedberg, Bavaria, Germany
Result	French victory

Belligerents
France	(Habsburg monarchy) Habsburg Austria

Commanders and leaders
(France) Jean Moreau	(Habsburg monarchy) Count Latour (Kingdom of France) Prince of Condé

Units involved
(France) Army of Rhin-et-Moselle	(Habsburg monarchy) Army of the Upper Rhine (Kingdom of France) Army of Condé

Strength
(France) 59,000	(Habsburg monarchy) 30,288 (Kingdom of France) 5,000–6,000

Casualties and losses
400	1,800, 17 guns

The Battle of Friedberg was fought on 24 August 1796 between a French First Republic army led by Jean Victor Marie Moreau and a Habsburg Austrian army led by Maximilian Anton Karl, Count Baillet de Latour. The French army, which was advancing eastward on the south side of the Danube, managed to catch an isolated Austrian infantry regiment. In the ensuing combat, the Austrians were cut to pieces. Friedberg is a Bavarian town located on the Lech River near Augsburg. The action was fought during the War of the First Coalition.

Two French armies crossed the Rhine and thrust east into Germany in the Rhine Campaign of 1796. Jean-Baptiste Jourdan's Army of Sambre-et-Meuse advanced on a more northerly route while Moreau's Army of Rhin-et-Moselle took a more southerly path. Opposing them were Wilhelm von Wartensleben's Army of the Lower Rhine and Latour's Army of the Upper Rhine, both under the overall direction of Archduke Charles, Duke of Teschen. Moreau defeated Charles at the battles of Ettlingen on 9 July and Neresheim on 11 August.

As the outnumbered Austrians retreated, Charles looked for a chance to throw a superior force against one of the French armies. That opportunity came in late August when a cavalry brigadier Friedrich Joseph, Count of Nauendorf reported an opening. Leaving Latour's army severely weakened, the archduke rapidly marched north with 27,000 troops to join with Wartensleben in defeating Jourdan at the Battle of Amberg on 24 August. Unaware of Charles' maneuver, Moreau forged ahead and smashed the isolated Schröder Infantry Regiment Nr. 7 at Friedberg. Unfortunately for Moreau, Jourdan's drubbing at Amberg and a second defeat at Würzburg ruined the French offensive. By the beginning of September, the increasingly isolated Moreau was compelled to retrace his steps toward France.
