= Battle of Theiningen =

1796 battle during the War of the First Coalition

- Part of the War of the First Coalition
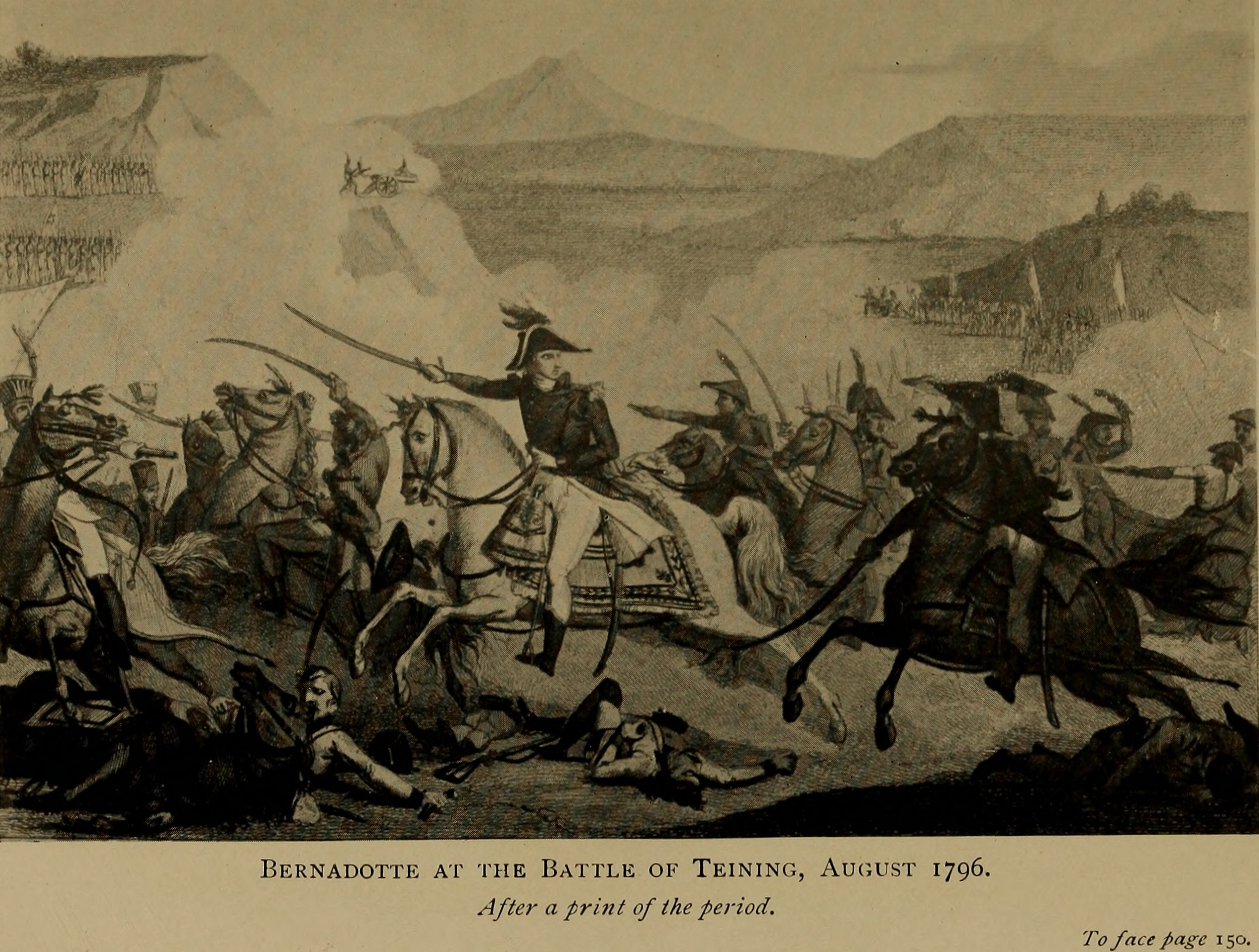
- General Bernadotte Charges the Austrian Center at the Battle of Theiningen
Date	21–22 August 1796
Location	Deining (Theiningen), Germany 49°13′N 11°31′E
Result	French Victory See § Result and aftermath

Belligerents
(France) French First Republic	(Holy Roman Empire) Habsburg monarchy

Commanders and leaders
(France) General of Division Bernadotte (WIA)	(Holy Roman Empire) Archduke Charles

Strength
9,000	28,000

Casualties and losses
Moderate	Moderate
- Location within Europe

The Battle of Theiningen took place in Germany on 22–23 August 1796 during the War of the First Coalition. A French division, led by Jean-Baptiste Bernadotte, repulsed an attempted encirclement, and fought a successful rearguard action, despite being outnumbered three-to-one, against an Austrian army led by Archduke Charles of Austria, allowing the French Army of Sambre and Meuse to retreat toward the Rhine.

== Prelude ==
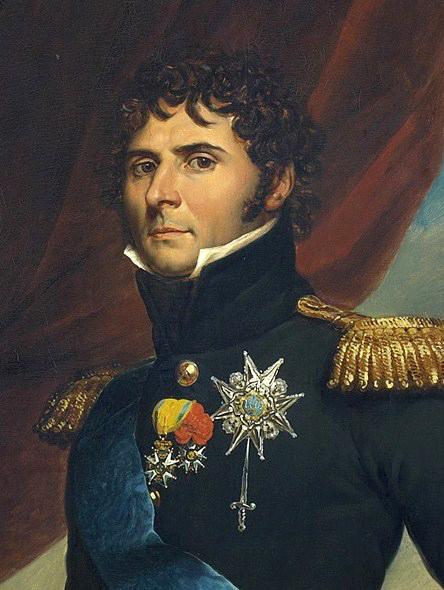
General Bernadotte's division repulsed numerous attacks despite being outnumbered three-to-one.

During July 1796, The French Army of Sambre and Meuse, and the Army of the Rhine and Moselle had begun the Rhine Campaign of 1796 against Austrian forces located in Southern Germany. After some success in its advance toward Bohemia, including the fall of Mannheim and Nuremberg, the Austrians regrouped and were reinforced and now outnumbered the French in the theater of operations. The Archduke Charles, perhaps the Austrians' finest military mind, had engaged in fabian tactics to preserve his forces until reinforcements allowed him to turn to the offensive.

With Austrian resistance stiffening, and intelligence that Charles had been massively reinforced, French General Jean-Baptiste Jourdan now saw need to protect his right flank. Jourdan ordered Bernadotte's division of 9,000 men to protect the Southern, right flank of the Army and to prevent the Austrians from cutting off the Army's line of retreat to the Rhine. Bernadotte's division began its movement South toward Ratisbon. Realizing that a single division would be inadequate for the task, Jourdan ordered Jacques Philippe Bonnaud to lead a cavalry division to rendezvous with Bernadotte.

Following his victory at the Battle of Neresheim on 11 August, Archduke Charles began planning a large counter-offensive against the French and began concentrating his forces for an attack on Jourdan, looking for opportunities to engage the French on unequal terms.

On 20 August 1796, Bernadotte marched from Altdorf toward Theiningen on the Ratisbon road when his troops encountered the outposts of the Austrian vanguard. A running fight began in which Bernadotte's division cut across the Austrian line of communications, cut off the Austrian vanguard from the main body and arrived at Theiningen later that evening. It was only then that Bernadotte was made aware that General Bonnaud's division was nowhere near and would not arrive anytime soon.

Meanwhile, Archduke Charles upon hearing of Bernadotte's thrust South, rushed his main body of 20,000 toward Theiningen in the hopes of destroying the isolated French force. Thus unsupported by Bonnaud, Bernadotte's division had effectively walked into a trap.

== Battle ==
On 21 August the Austrian vanguard made contact with Bernadotte's outposts on the Ratisbon road near Theiningen. The French forces fell back toward Theiningen and placed itself on the heights outside the town. According to the noted military theorist Antoine-Henri Jomini the position was a strong and well selected one. The Austrians and the French took the remainder of the day to prepare for the coming battle. Archduke Charles arrived with his main body of the Austrian army, some 20,000 strong, fusing them with his vanguard and other elements later in the day. By nightfall there were now 28,000 Austrians facing 9,000 French.

Archduke Charles began placing his troops for an assault in the morning, though he was unsure of the numbers of the French ahead of him. Bernadotte used the evening to perfect his dispositions and as 22 August dawned the French lined up for battle in a manner that masked their true numbers.

The day started with an Austrian assault against the center of the line; the first of many. Numerous assaults followed with Archduke Charles resolved to destroy the badly outnumbered French force. The battle swayed back and forth and the village changed hands several times. General Jean Sarrazin, who took part in the battle, later described the conflict:

"The engagement was a sanguinary one, and success was diversified during the whole day. The village of Theiningen was taken and retaken several times; the streets were strewed with dead bodies, and towards the evening the village was set on fire, the enemy being persuaded that that was the only means of dislodging the troops which were entrenched in the houses. Meanwhile, the Archduke ordered his right wing to attack Bernadotte's left. The 88th Regiment of the Line infantry which was upon that point was obliged to retreat. Bernadotte's position became very critical, as the Austrians, by the advantage they had obtained, found themselves masters of the main road to Neumarkt, the only one by which the French could retreat...

Convinced of the necessity of retaking the ground lost by his left, Bernadotte placed himself at the head of his reserve, consisting of a battalion of grenadiers of the 37th Regiment of the Line infantry, and of the 7th Regiment of Dragoons, which composed a force of about 4,000 strong. 'You know, my friends,' said the general to them, 'what care I have always taken of your welfare, since I had the happiness of commanding such brave fellows as yourselves. The opportunity now presents itself of testifying your grateful sense of it, of deserving well of your country, and of covering yourselves with glory...'

Bernadotte then gave orders to beat the charge, and marched in close column against the center of the enemy's line who, staggered by the daring the movement, though three times more numerous, made but weak resistance, and retired in disorder to their former position. The Archduke, despairing of carrying Bernadotte's position by main force, ordered the firing to stop..."

The counter-attack nearly broke the Austrian line and checked the Austrian assault until darkness fell. That evening, Bernadotte's division withdrew under the cover of night and retreated to Neumarkt. The following day, 23 August, the Austrians pursued Bernadotte's division without effect. Bernadotte took care to hide his numbers by way of effective cavalry screen and gave the Archduke Charles the impression that his command was larger than it really was. As a consequence, Charles' movements were deliberate and time-consuming, allowing the French to retreat toward Nuremberg in good order. Bernadotte had slipped the Austrian trap.

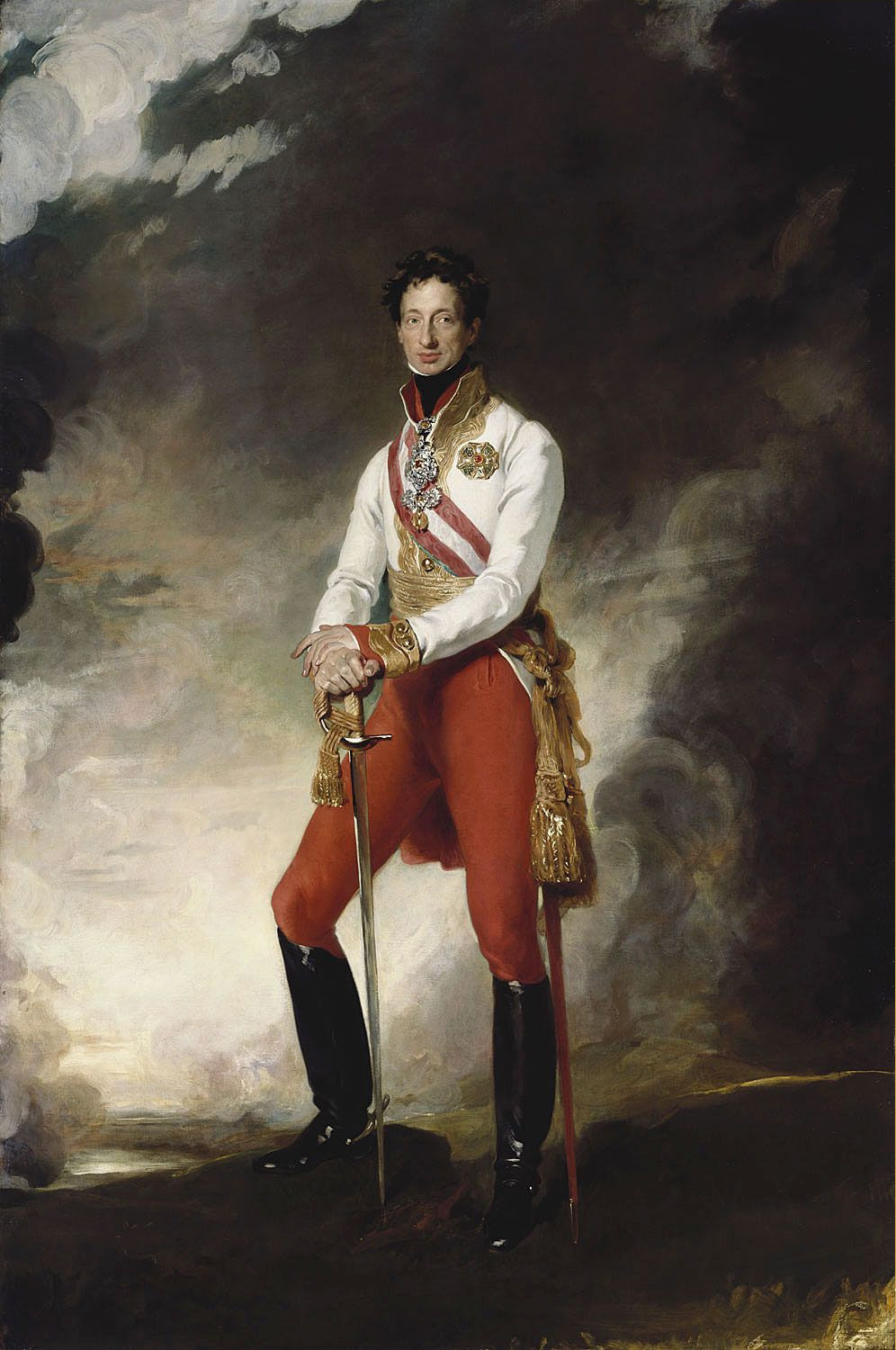
Portrait of Archduke Charles by Thomas Lawrence. Archduke Charles failed to destroy Bernadotte's Division but still drove the French out of Germany and across the Rhine by September 1796. Charles would again face Bernadotte, this time in Italy, in Spring of 1797.

== Result and aftermath ==
Though out-numbering the French three-to-one, the Austrians failed to dislodge the French and suffered heavy casualties in the process. Jomini's opinion was that "with his superior numbers, the Archduke ought to have had no difficulty in annihilating Bernadotte and his division." Further, Bernadotte's bluff in presenting his division as a much larger force caused the Austrians to maneuver as if faced by the whole Army [of the Sambre and Meuse], greatly slowing their pursuit. Bernadotte's slow, days long, retreat North delayed the Austrians and prevented them from cutting off Jourdan's line of retreat following his defeat at the Battle of Amberg. Bernadotte's division later rendezvoused with Jourdan on 27 August who continued to retreat to the Rhine.

However, Archduke Charles had by then caught up with the French, who then turned and launched a daring counter-stroke, but Jourdan was soundly defeated at the Battle of Würzburg. Despite the setback, the Army of Sambre and Meuse was able to safely cross the Rhine back into France in September 1796. Bernadotte had been wounded by a saber slash to the forehead at Theiningen during the attack on the Austrian center and missed the Battle of Würzburg as a consequence.

For Archduke Charles, the triumph at Würzburg and the retreat of French forces back across the Rhine marked the pinnacle of a successful turnaround for Austria's military fortunes after enduring years of setbacks against the emerging French Republic; the victory serving as a personal vindication for him. With Germany free of French presence, the Austrians were able to redeploy Archduke Charles and thousands of his troops to Italy, where the French had seen significant success over the summer.

Meanwhile, Bernadotte's rearguard actions against so superior an enemy, and the slipping of the Austrian trap, were highly acclaimed in France as the bright spot of a severe military setback and a summer of frustration against the Austrians. Of the performance of Bernadotte, and his division, Paul Barras, then leader of the French Government, said:

"The rest of the campaign would have been still more disastrous had it not been for the intrepid resistance made to the Austrians by Bernadotte, the general of the vanguard, who had become the general of the rear-guard. During this retreat, as skillful as it was daring, Bernadotte drew upon himself for the resources which it was necessary to improvise in order to meet events unforeseen by the general-in-chief. On the most critical occasion Bernadotte displayed skill and resourcefulness... May France preserve to its glory the generous soldiers who are now springing from the bosom of the soil of liberty! Foreign and French military men said at the time that there was something of Xenophon in Bernadotte."

Despite the failure of the French Rhine Campaign of 1796, by late 1797 the Austrians would be forced to sign a peace treaty with the French Republic due to the victories of another French general, Napoleon Bonaparte in Italy, of which, Bernadotte and his division would take part (and face, and defeat, Archduke Charles once more at the Passage of the Tagliamento) following the transfer of 20,000 men under Bernadotte from Jourdan's army to the Army of Italy.

Preceded by Battle of Castiglione	French Revolution: Revolutionary campaigns Battle of Theiningen	Succeeded by Battle of Neresheim
