= Siegfried von Kospoth =

Austrian army officer (1740–1809)

Siegfried Freiherr von Kospoth, born in 1740 and died in Kremsier (Kromĕříž) Moravia on 16 December 1809, was an officer of the Habsburg Army during the Wars of First and Second Coalitions.

== Military experience ==
Kospoth was a colonel from 1783 until 1790 and commander of the second Carabiniers Regiments N. 6, also known as the Archduke Franz Regiment. In the War of the First Coalition he served in the Habsburg Army of the Upper Rhine under Dagobert Sigmund von Wurmser as Generalmajor and in 1793 as a brigade commander.

In 1796, he was promoted to Lieutenant Fieldmarshal under Baillet de Latour Kospoth participated with the 16th squadron of the second column under Sztáray in the Battle of Malsch and 2 October 1792, he commanded a mixed division of 6,100 men in the first Battle of Biberach. He participated in the preliminaries at the Battle of Handschuhsheim. From 10. November 1796 until 9. January 1797 he participated in the siege of the French bridgehead at the Kehl.

During the War of the Second Coalition, Kospoth commanded a division in the reserve corps of the main army of Archduke Charles. He participated in the battles at Ostrach on 21. March 1799 and Stockach am 25. March 1799. Until May 1799 he commanded the Corps of Observation Villingen and in the Black Forest. At the storming of Mannheim on 18 September 1799, he commanded Archduke Charles' second column.

At the beginning of 1800, he commanded the heavy Cavalry reserve of the main army in the Swabian Circle, under the orders of Paul Kray. In the same year, he participated in the Battle of Engen and Battle of Messkirch. On 1. March 1801 he was promoted to General of Cavalry.
