= Theodor Franz, Count Baillet von Latour =

Austrian soldier and statesman

Theodor Graf Baillet de Latour
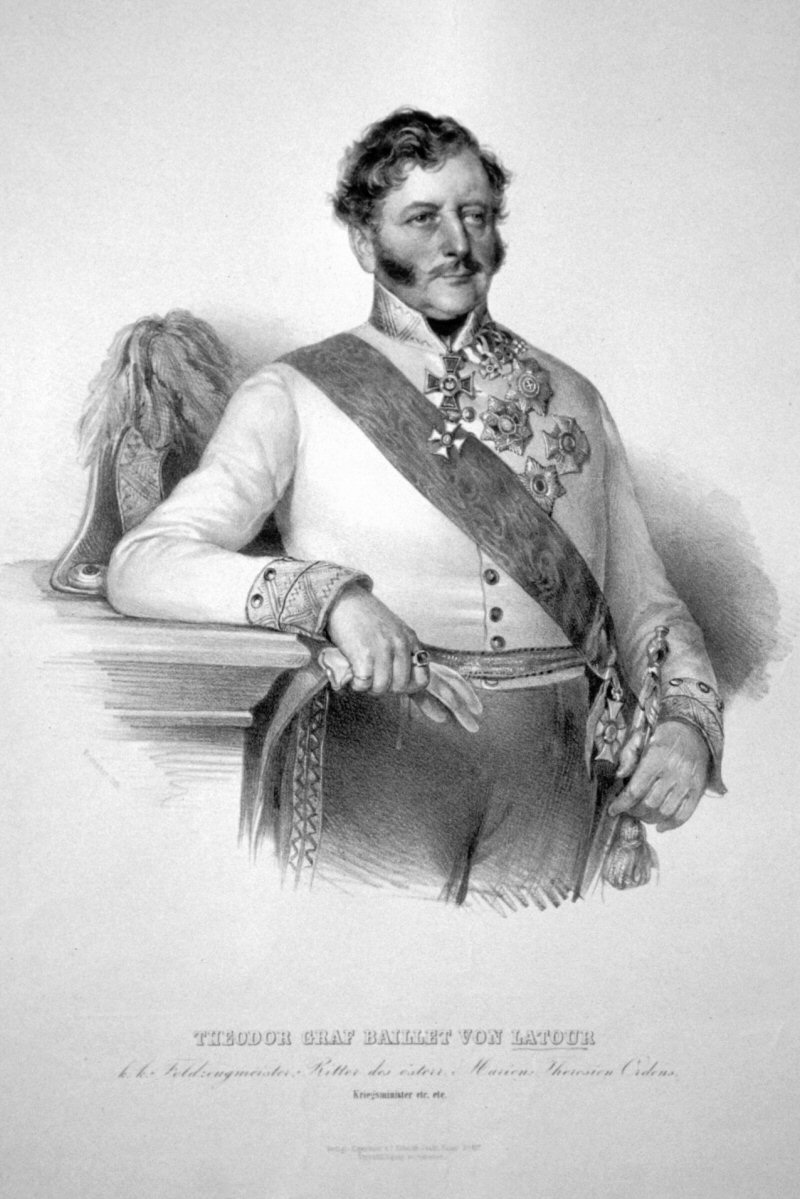
- Lithograph by Josef Kriehuber
- Born: 15 June 1780; Linz, Austria
- Died: 6 October 1848 (aged 68); Vienna
- Military career
- Allegiance: Austrian Empire
- Branch: Imperial and Royal Army
- Rank: Feldzeugmeister
- Conflicts: Marengo – Ulm – Dresden – Leipzig
- Awards: Military Order of Maria Theresa
- Other work: Minister of War

Theodor Franz, Count of Baillet von Latour (15 June 1780 – 6 October 1848) was an Austrian soldier and statesman. As the Imperial Minister of War, he was killed by a mob at the beginning of the Vienna Uprising.

== Biography ==
Latour was born at Linz the son of Count Maximilian Anton Karl Baillet de Latour (1737 – 1806), a Feldmarschall-Leutnant in Austrian service during the Revolutionary Wars of Walloon descent. After a military and engineering training at the Theresian Military Academy, he entered the corps of engineers in 1799 and became a member of the general staff of the Austrian Imperial and Royal Army in 1804. Latour took part in various military campaigns of the Napoleonic Wars in which he distinguished himself and was highly decorated.

During European Restoration he filled an array of leadership roles in the military ranks up to a Feldzeugmeister, and in addition served as the head of the military commission attached to the Bundesversammlung (assembly) of the German Confederation at Frankfurt, contributed to the design of the fortifications at Rastatt, and finally was director of engineering.

In the Revolutions of 1848 he was called to head the war ministry in the cabinet of Minister-President Count Karl Ludwig von Ficquelmont, whose direction he saw to without regard to his advanced years. A distinct asserter of conservatism, his efforts especially sought to give the public no cause for unrest. Faced with the Hungarian Revolution, Latour backed the loyal forces of Ban Josip Jelačić and arranged troops to second his campaign. These efforts sparked the Vienna Uprising: On 6 October 1848 a crowd of students, workers and mutinous soldiers forcibly tried to prevent the troops marching off. In the following street fights, an outraged mob sought Latour out in the war ministry and lynched him, repeatedly clubbing and stabbing him and then leaving his dead body hanging from a street light for fourteen hours.
