= Battle of Amberg =

1796 battle during the War of the First Coalition

- Part of the Rhine Campaign of the War of the First Coalition
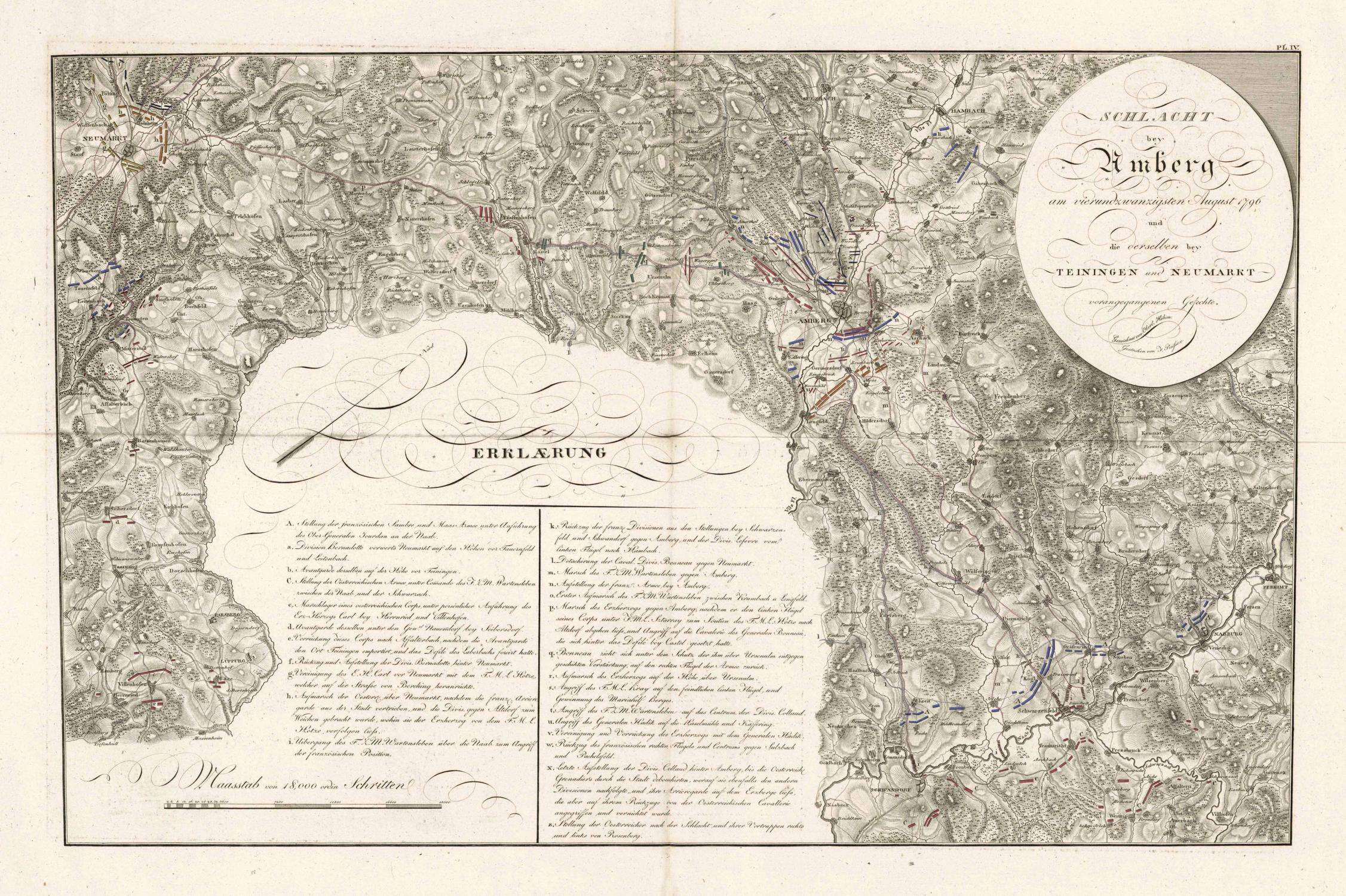
- German map of the battle
Date	24 August 1796
Location	Amberg 49°28′16″N 11°49′52″E
Result	Austrian victory

Belligerents
Republican France	Habsburg monarchy

Commanders and leaders
(France) Jean-Baptiste Jourdan	(Habsburg monarchy) Archduke Charles (Habsburg monarchy) Wilhelm von Wartensleben

Strength
34,000	40,000

Casualties and losses
2,000	400
- Location within Europe

The Battle of Amberg, fought on 24 August 1796, resulted in a Habsburg victory by Archduke Charles over a French army led by Jean-Baptiste Jourdan. This engagement marked a turning point in the Rhine campaign, which had previously seen French successes.

== Background ==
=== Plans ===
The French planned an invasion of southern Germany in 1796. General of Division (MG) Jourdan with the Army of Sambre-et-Meuse would advance from the middle Rhine while MG Jean Moreau would cross the river farther south with the Army of Rhin-et-Moselle. Jourdan held a bridgehead over the Rhine at Neuwied while MG Jean-Baptiste Kléber commanded his left wing based on an entrenched camp at Düsseldorf. Moreau's army comprised 71,581 infantry and 6,515 cavalry. He organized these into a Right Wing under MG Pierre Ferino, a Center led by MG Louis Desaix, and a Left Wing commanded by MG Laurent de Gouvion Saint-Cyr.

Field Marshal Archduke Charles commanded the Army of the Lower Rhine. Charles and his deputy, Feldzeugmeister (FZM) Wilhelm von Wartensleben faced Jourdan along the Lahn River. This stream flows in a southwesterly direction into the Rhine near Koblenz. To the south, FZM Maximilien, Count Baillet de Latour positioned his Army of the Upper Rhine to defend against Moreau.

=== June operations ===
On 4 June 1796, 11,000 soldiers of the Army of the Sambre-et-Meuse, under François Lefebvre pushed back a 6,500-man Austrian force at Altenkirchen, north of the Lahn. On 6 June, the French placed Ehrenbreitstein Fortress under siege. At Wetzlar on the Lahn, Lefebvre ran into Charles' concentration of 36,000 Austrians on 15 June. Casualties were light on both sides, but Jourdan pulled back to Niewied while Kléber recoiled toward Düsseldorf. Feldmarschal-Leutnant (FML) Pál Kray's 30,000 soldiers bested Kléber's 24,000 at Uckerath east of Bonn on 19 June, prompting the Frenchman to continue his withdrawal to the north.

Meanwhile, operations of the Army of the Rhin-et-Moselle progressed more successfully for the French. On the 15th, Desaix and 30,000 French troops defeated FML Franz Petrasch's 11,000 Austrians at Maudach near Speyer. The French suffered 600 casualties while Austrian losses were three times as heavy. Part of Moreau's army under MG Jean-Charles Abbatucci mounted an assault crossing over the Rhine at Kehl opposite Strasbourg on 24 June. The defenders were French émigrés and the forces of minor German states belonging to the Holy Roman Empire. They fought gamely, but were beaten with the loss of 700 men while the French lost 150. On 28 June, Desaix defeated FML Anton Sztaray's Imperial troops again at Renchen, inflicting 1,400 casualties for only 200 French killed and wounded. In the following weeks the Austrians determined some of their Imperial German allies to be unreliable and disarmed them.

In reaction to the defeats in the south, Archduke Charles left Wartensleben in command of 35,000 men along the Lahn, put 30,000 troops into the fortress of Mainz and rushed south with 20,000 soldiers to reinforce Latour.

=== July operations ===
After a minor clash at Rastatt on 5 July, Archduke Charles and Latour took up a position at Malsch with 32,000 troops. On 9 July, Moreau defeated the Army of the Upper Rhine at the Battle of Ettlingen. The archduke retreated 60 kilometres (37 mi) to Stuttgart, where he skirmished with the French on 21 July before continuing to withdraw east. When Jourdan heard of French successes against the Army of the Upper Rhine, he went over to the offensive. After a series of minor victories at Neuwied, Giessen, and Friedberg in der Wetterau in early July, the French pressed Wartensleben back to Frankfurt am Main.

=== August operations ===
Charles ordered Wartensleben to unite with him in order to crush Moreau. However, his colleague proved unwilling to cooperate. On 11 August, Moreau overpowered the outnumbered archduke at the Battle of Neresheim. The Austrian southern wing retreated to the south bank of the Danube at Donauwörth. To the north, Jourdan pushed Wartensleben back through Würzburg and Nuremberg. Kléber clashed with Kray on 17 August at Sulzbach-Rosenberg, 14 kilometres (8.7 mi) west of Amberg. Charles' strategy of falling back before the two superior French armies while seeking an opportunity to combine against one of them had so far failed.

== Battle ==
=== Reconnaissance ===
A change in Austrian fortunes came when an alert cavalry brigadier, General-Major Friedrich Joseph, Count of Nauendorf detected an opportunity during a wide reconnaissance. He sent a note to Archduke Charles, "If your Royal Highness will or can advance 12,000 men against Jourdan's rear, he is lost." Charles left 30,000 men under Latour to watch Moreau, and hurried north with 27,000 to find Jourdan still pressing Wartensleben near Amberg. On 22 August at Neumarkt in der Oberpfalz, Charles brushed aside one of Jourdan's divisions under MG Jean-Baptiste Bernadotte. This placed the archduke squarely on the French right rear.

=== Combat ===
The total forces available were 48,000 Austrians and 45,000 French. On 24 August, Charles struck the French right flank while Wartensleben attacked frontally. The French Army of Sambre-et-Meuse was overcome by weight of numbers and Jourdan retired northwest. The Austrians lost only 400 casualties of the 40,000 men they brought onto the field. French losses were 1,200 killed and wounded, plus 800 captured out of 34,000 engaged. Instead of supporting his colleague, Moreau pushed further east.

=== Results ===
On the same day as the Battle of Amberg, Moreau inflicted a sharp defeat on Latour at the Battle of Friedberg in Bavaria. On 1 September, Moreau clashed with Latour and Nauendorf at Geisenfeld, 16 kilometres (9.9 mi) southeast of Ingolstadt. At the same time, Charles' victorious Austrians pursued Jourdan's beaten army. The widening gap between the two French armies finally caused Moreau to abandon his gains and pull back toward Ulm. The Battle of Würzburg, fought on 3 September, would determine the winner of the campaign.

== Bibliography ==
- Eggenberger, David. (1985). An Encyclopedia of Battles. New York: Dover Publications. ISBN 0-486-24913-1.
- Liddell-Hart, B. H. (1967). Strategy. NY: Praeger Publishers.
- Pope, Stephen. (1999). The Cassell Dictionary of the Napoleonic Wars, Cassell.
- Smith, Digby. (1998). The Napoleonic Wars Data Book. London: Greenhill. ISBN 1-85367-276-9.

Preceded by Battle of Neresheim	French Revolution: Revolutionary campaigns Battle of Amberg	Succeeded by Battle of Würzburg
