= Wilhelm von Wartensleben =

Swedish nobleman active in the Dutch military

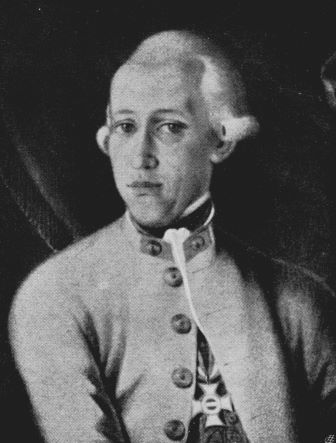
Wilhelm von Wartensleben (1734–1798)

Gustav Wilhelm Ludwig Count Wartensleben (11 October 1734 – 21 April 1798) was a Swedish nobleman active in the Austrian and Dutch military.

He was born in Hesse-Kassel. He was the younger son of the Swedish royal house and the princely Hesse house of Schaumburg. His father was Karl Philip Christian, Count Wartensleben, and his mother was Albertine Louise, Baroness von Quadt and Wykradt. Initially he joined the Dutch army, but transferred his talents to the Habsburg army in 1758, commissioned as a major. He was assigned to the Szluiner Grenz Infantry Regiment. For his service in the War of the Bavarian Succession he was promoted to Colonel and Proprietor of the Infantry Regiment Nr. 28, a position he held from 1779 until his death on 21 April 1798. In the course of the engagements around Mehadia (1788) as part of the Austro-Turkish War, Koca Yusuf Pasha, the Turkish commander, took advantage of the Austrian tactic of an extended front, and outmanoeuvred Wartensleben. Wartensleben received the Knights' Cross of the Military Order of Maria Theresa on 22 April 1790, and the Commander's Cross on 19 December. In 1794, in the Battle of Lambusart, he commanded a column operating on the right flank of the army of Prince of Orange. He commanded the autonomous force of the Lower Rhine in 1796. When his force finally joined that of Archduke Charles, Duke of Teschen in August 1796, their combined efforts inflicted the first defeat of the summer campaign on the French army, at the Battle of Amberg. He was mortally wounded at the Battle of Emmendingen on 19 October 1796, in which his left arm was shattered by French caseshot, and died over a year later in Vienna.
