= Maximilian Anton Karl, Count Baillet de Latour =

General in Austrian service (1737–1806)

Maximilian Anton Karl Baillet de Latour
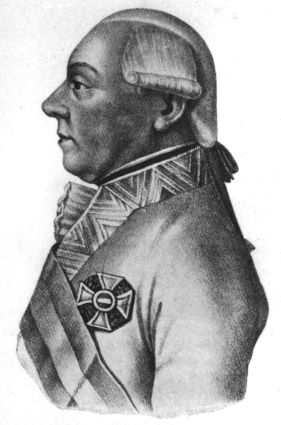
- Maximilian Anton Karl, Count Baillet de Latour
- Born: 14 December 1737; Virton, Austrian Netherlands
- Died: 22 July 1806 (aged 68); Vienna, Austrian Empire
- Children: Theodor Franz, Count Baillet von Latour
- Military career
- Allegiance: Habsburg Monarchy
- Service years: 1755–1806
- Rank: General of the Cavalry
- Conflicts: Seven Years' War; Brabant Revolution; French Revolutionary Wars; War of the First Coalition; Battle of Sprimont; War of the Second Coalition

Count Maximilian Anton Karl Baillet de Latour (French: Maximilien-Antoine-Charles-Joseph Comte de Baillet de Latour) (14 December 1737 – 22 July 1806) was an Austrian general during the French Revolutionary Wars.

== Biography ==
Born at Latour Castle near Virton in the Austrian Netherlands (present-day Belgium), he joined the Austrian Army in 1755 and distinguished himself in the Seven Years' War. In 1772 he married Charlotte-Sophie de Guérin de La Marche (d-1806); their son, Count Theodor Franz Baillet von Latour, was Austrian minister of war during the Revolutions of 1848, and was murdered during the Vienna Uprising. His brother, Count Ludwig Wilhelm Anton Baillet de Latour-Merlemont (1753–1836), was also a general in Austrian service, until 1810, when he resigned, and joined the Grande Armée of Napoleon.

Latour achieved the rank of a Generalmajor in 1782. In the course of the 1789 revolt that led to the proclamation of the autonomous United States of Belgium, Latour was elevated to the rank of a Feldmarschall-Leutnant. His troops held the Duchy of Luxembourg and played a significant role in regaining the rebellious provinces by the end of 1790, which earned him the Military Order of Maria Theresa. From 1792 onwards Latour fought as an Austrian commander in the Wars of the First and Second Coalition. In 1796 he was promoted to General of the Cavalry. In 1805 Emperor Francis I of Habsburg appointed him president of the Hofkriegsrat, Latour nevertheless died shortly afterwards in Vienna.
