= Louis Dominique Munnier =

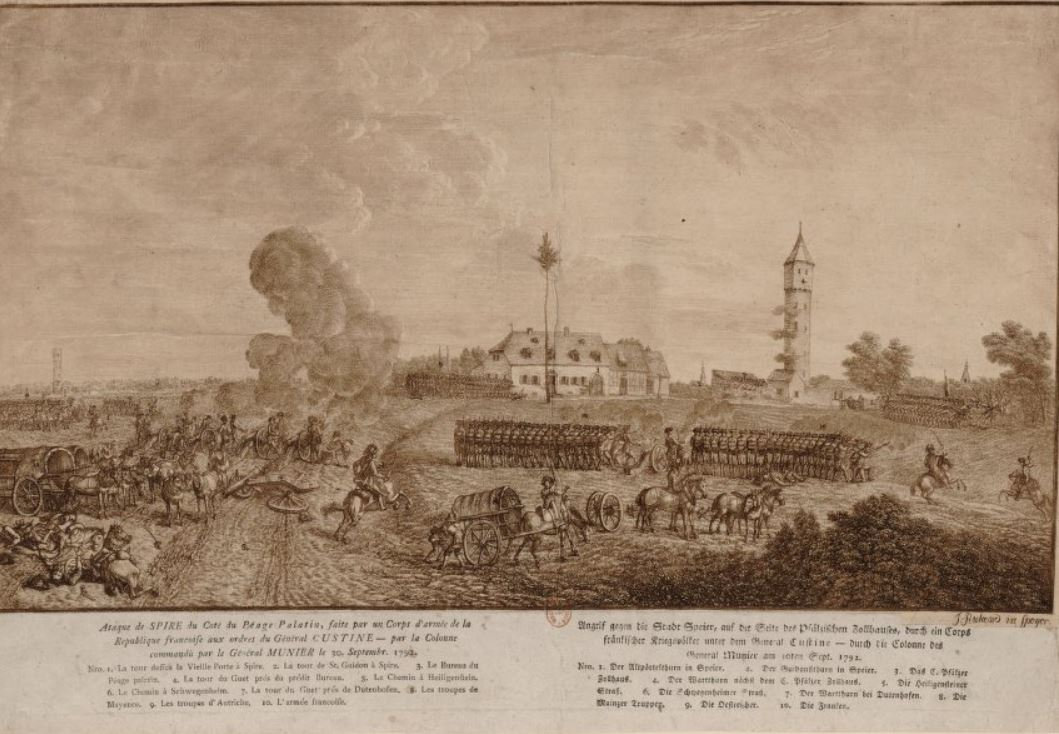
- Munnier participated in the capture of Speyer as part of the Rhineland Campaign in 1792
- Born: 17 December 1734; Phalsbourg (Moselle )
- Died: 1801 (aged 66–67); Nancy, (Meurthe-et-Moselle)
- Military career
- Allegiance: France
- Branch: French Army
- Service years: 1758–1799
- Conflicts: French Revolutionary Wars

Louis Dominique Munnier or Meunier (17 December 1734 in Phalsbourg (Moselle ) – 1800 in Nancy, (Meurthe-et-Moselle)), was a general of the French Revolutionary Wars. (Note: His baptismal certificate of 18 December 1734 shows the spelling of his family name as Meunier, but in 1780, he called himself Louis-Dominique Munnier and signed a document with the latter spelling. Spelling reverts to Meunier on his pension patent, dated 10 February 1795, probably because of the spelling of the baptismal certificate. See État Nominatif Des Pensions, Traitemens Conservés, Dons ..., Volume 1, Imprimerie Nationale, 1790, p. 85.) He joined the military in 1748 as an ensign, and progressed through the ranks. Embracing the French Revolution's principles, he became a colonel in the 62nd Infantry Regiment, serving at Valmy, Hondschoote, and Mainz.

== Military service ==
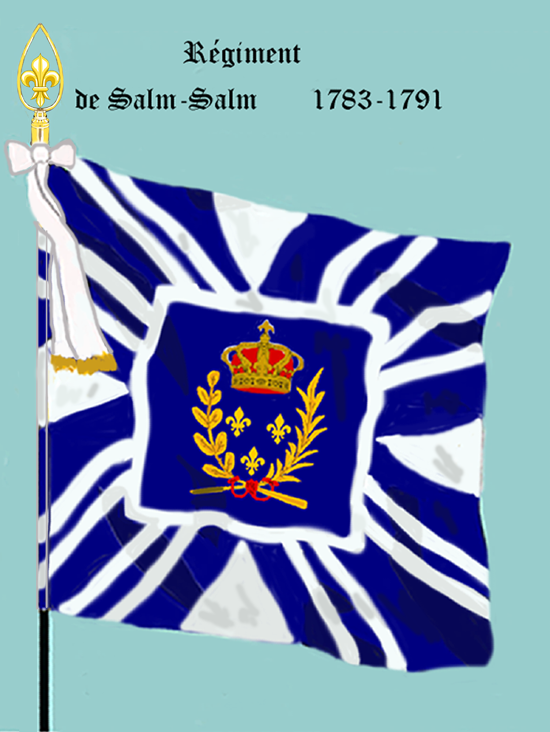
Regimental Flag of the Regiment Salm-Salm

He entered service 21 May 1748 as an ensign in the Regiment Lowendal (Colonel and proprietor: (1) Woldemar de Lowendal, and (2) François Xavier Joseph, comte de Lowendal), and was promoted to second lieutenant on 1 October 1756 and first lieutenant 5 November 1758. This regiment served throughout the Seven Years' War but on 18 January 1760, the first battalion, to which he was attached, merged into the Regiment Anhalt, and the second merged into the Regiment de La Marck. On 2 March 1773 he was made a knight of Order of Saint Louis. On 28 February 1778, he became captain of grenadiers, and on 20 March he was promoted to major. During this time, also, the regiment served in the American colonies in the war against the British. He was appointed lieutenant colonel in the Regiment Salm-Salm on 2 January 1783, and 25 July 1791, he became the regimental colonel, in the renamed 62nd Infantry Regiment, replacing the prince of Salm-Salm. (Note: (in French) The princes fled in 1791, to Germany, where they established themselves in Anhalt. See Office de Tourisme Pays des Abbayes, History of the Salm-Salm family. here. Accessed 24 March 2015.) The regiment subsequently distinguished itself at Valmy. He was promoted to brigadier general on 7 September 1792, and Ernest, Baron Ruttemberg replaced him as regimental commander for a short time (until his own defection to the emigre army). On 21 October 1792, he, Anne Rene Joseph Petigny, and Adam Philippe, Comte de Custine accepted the capitulation of the city of Mainz, offered by Rudolf Eickemeyer. While 22,000 of Custine's men remained at Mainz, Munnier commanded a column that moved on Oppenheim and Speyer. (Note: He commanded the 32nd infantry, the 2nd Haute-Saone and 3rd Nievre units of the National Guard, portions of the 93rd infantry, 4th Vosges and 5th Seine-et-Oisem, which he positioned at Worms; 46nd infantry, 3rd Bas-Rhin and 2nd Puy-de-Dome, positioned at Frankenthal; the 27th infantry, 3rd Doubs National Guard, 30th Infantry and 3rd Haut-Rhine national Guard at Oggersheim and Mutterstad; the 3rd infantry the 1st and 3rd l'Ain, which he positioned at Speyer. The remainder of his troops he positioned in Speyer and Germersheim. See Chuquet, pp. 231.)

Munnier was promoted to major general on 28 October, at the time part of the Army of the North. On 15 March 1793, his column was transferred to the Army of the Rhine, where he commanded the right wing. That summer, his commander, Custine was arrested, tried for treason and executed; from 30 September to 2 October of that year, Munnier temporarily commanded the Army of the Rhine but on 23 October 1793, he was relieved of his command and arrested in Strasbourg; subsequently, he too was accused of treason, tried before the Revolutionary Tribunal, but acquitted. On 18 November 1794, he was released from prison and reinstated to his rank. He was admitted to retirement on 10 February 1795.
