= François Ignace Schaal =

French general and statesman

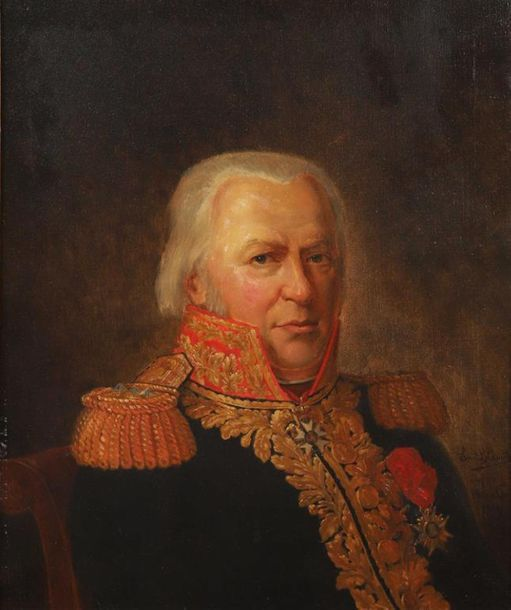
- Portrait of François Ignace Schaal
- Born: 5 December 1747; Colmar (Alsace), France
- Died: 30 August 1833 (aged 85); Sélestat (Bas-Rhin), France
- Military career
- Allegiance: Kingdom of France; France
- Branch: Cavalry
- Service years: (Kingdom of France) 1768–1791 (France) 1791–1814
- Rank: General of Division
- Awards: Order of St. Louis
- Other work: Mayor, Sélestat, 1800–1807 delegate of the Bas-Rhin to the Legislative Assembly 1808–1812

François Ignace Schaal, born and baptized on 5 December 1747 in Colmar (Alsace) and died on 30 August 1833 at Sélestat (Bas-Rhin), was a French general and statesman of the French Revolutionary Wars and the First Empire. He was one of six children (four of whom grew to adulthood) of Jean-Baptiste Schaal, a lawyer in Colmar and Anne Barbe Kubler.

== Military career ==
He entered service on 1 August 1768, as an ensign in the artillery, and was appointed second lieutenant on 8 May 1770. When the French Revolution started, he was a captain in the Nassau Regiment (later the 96th regiment). He was raised to general of brigade provisionally on 8 March 1793, he was appointed major general on 13 June 1795. He was a Commander of the Royal Order of the Legion of Honour on 17 October 1814, Knight of Order of St. Louis. He married Josephine Aglaée Bon Fabry.

During the French Revolution, he was one of the commanders of the Republican army, especially during the Siege of Mainz (1792) and he distinguished himself in Cassel (Mainz). In 1793, shortly after the military reorganization, he was a lieutenant colonel of the 93rd Regiment, formerly the Duke of Enghien's regiment; the first battalion of this regiment served in the Army of the Rhine under Adam Philippe, Comte de Custine; the second at Strasbourg, and the grenadiers at Mainz. Although only a brigadier general, he commanded the Army of the Rhine from 14 February to 29 April 1795. He had not sought command of the Army of the Rhine—indeed, Desaix, and others had flat out refused to take command and had finally convinced the Committee in Paris that Schaal was the man for the job, despite his being a brigadier and they, generals of division—but Schaal had taken the command against his better judgement and executed it as best he could. To give the others credit, they had followed his orders precisely, as uninspired as they were.

At the 1795 engagement at Mainz, Schaal commanded two columns, one from the Army of the Rhine and the other from the Army of Moselle, that had been separated from their respective armies to take Mainz. However, when it came to the renewal of siege at Mainz, he commanded the united columns, one from each army, that comprised the Armée devant Mayence (the Army before Mainz). When the critical time came, however, Schaal was a mere figurehead implementing a strategy at Mainz that he had neither thought of, or approved. He entered retirement.

He tried to re-enter the military in 1799, seeking an appointment to André Masséna's Army of Helvetia. He entered full retirement on 4 September 1815. His name is inscribed on the Arc de Triomphe, on the eastern side of the fourteenth column facing the Champs-Élysées. He was mayor of Sélestat from 1800–1807 and a delegate of the Bas-Rhin to the Legislative Assembly from 1808–1812.

He was the father-in-law of General Henri-Jacques Martin de Lagarde, who married his daughter, Marie, Augustine (born 1796) in Mainz, on 1 February 1815.
