= First Battle of Wissembourg =

Part of the War of the First Coalition

- Part of the War of the First Coalition
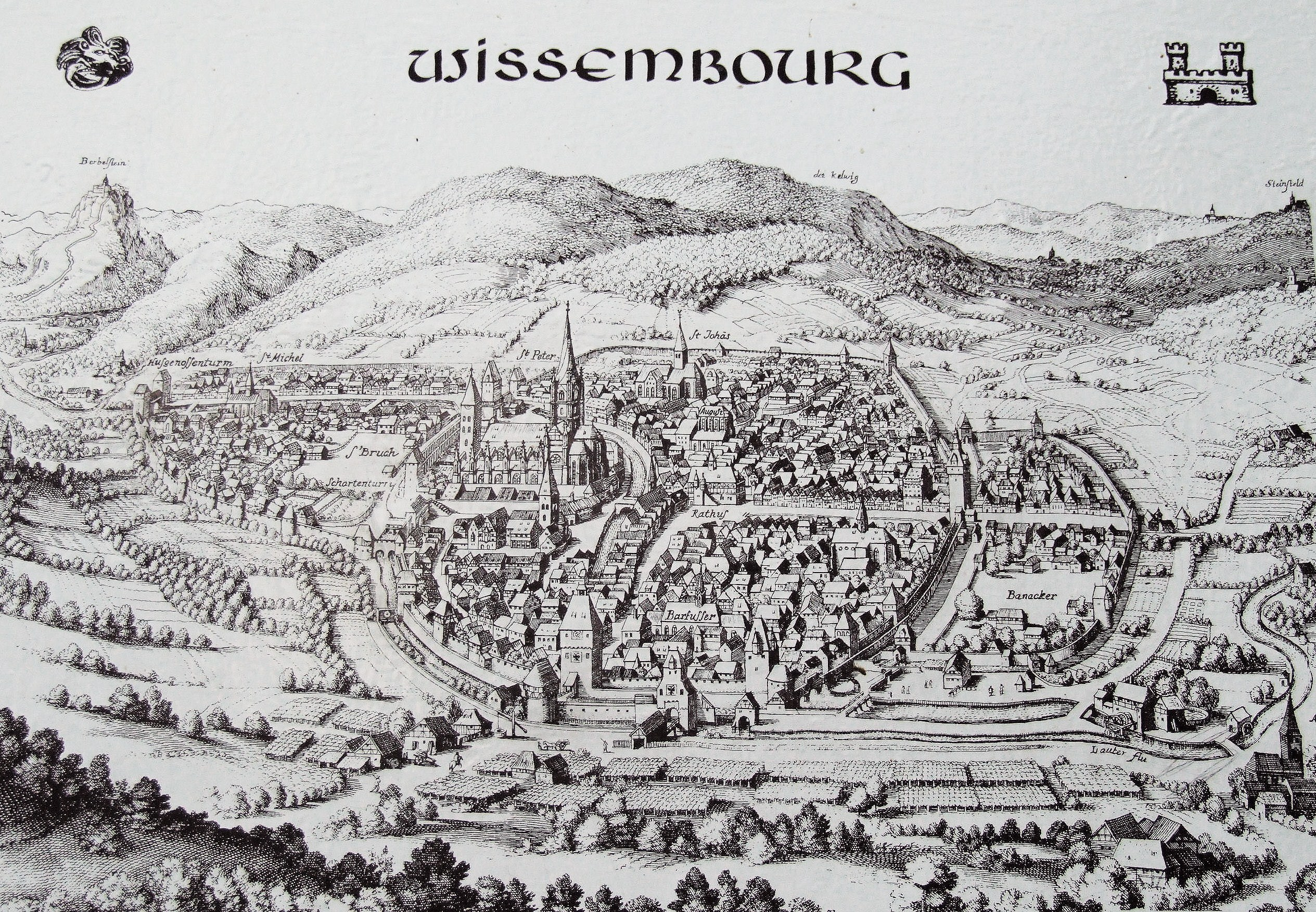
- Wissembourg in the 17th century
Date	13 October 1793
Location	Wissembourg, Bas-Rhin, France 49.0383°N 7.9469°E
Result	Austrian-Allied victory

Belligerents
France	Habsburg Monarchy; Hesse-Kassel (Kingdom of France) French Émigrés

Commanders and leaders
(France) Jean Pascal Carlenc	(Habsburg monarchy) Dagobert Wurmser

Strength
51,590	42,234

Casualties and losses
3,000, 31 guns	1,800
- Location within Europe

In the First Battle of Wissembourg (13 October 1793) an Allied army commanded by Dagobert Sigmund von Wurmser attacked the French Army of the Rhine under Jean Pascal Carlenc. After an ineffectual resistance, the French army abandoned its fortified line behind the Lauter River and retreated toward Strasbourg in confusion. This engagement of the War of the First Coalition occurred on the eastern border of France about 60 kilometres (37 mi) north of Strasbourg.

After the siege of Mainz in which the Prussian army captured the city, the Army of the Rhine fell back into the Lines of Weissenburg, a position first fortified in 1706. Soon Wurmser with an army composed of troops from Habsburg monarchy, French Royalists and allied German states began putting pressure on the Lines. Meanwhile, the French army organization was in disarray after two previous army commanders were arrested and sent to Paris prisons. Since no one wanted to lead the army, the representatives on mission appointed Carlenc, recently a lieutenant colonel of cavalry. After a series of skirmishes, Wurmser launched a successful assault. After the French retreat, the inept Carlenc was arrested and replaced in army command by Jean-Charles Pichegru. At the urging of the government, Pichegru began launching a series of attacks designed to recover the lost territory. These resulted in the battles of Froeschwiller and the Second Battle Wissembourg.

== Background ==
During the War of the First Coalition, General der Kavallerie Wurmser's Austro-Allied army threatened to invade Alsace. Accordingly, the French Army of the Rhine manned the Lines of Weissenburg, a line of earthworks dating back to the War of the Spanish Succession. The lines began near Wissembourg and stretched about 20 kilometers in an east-southeasterly direction to the Rhine River at Lauterbourg. This traces the modern-day France-Germany border.

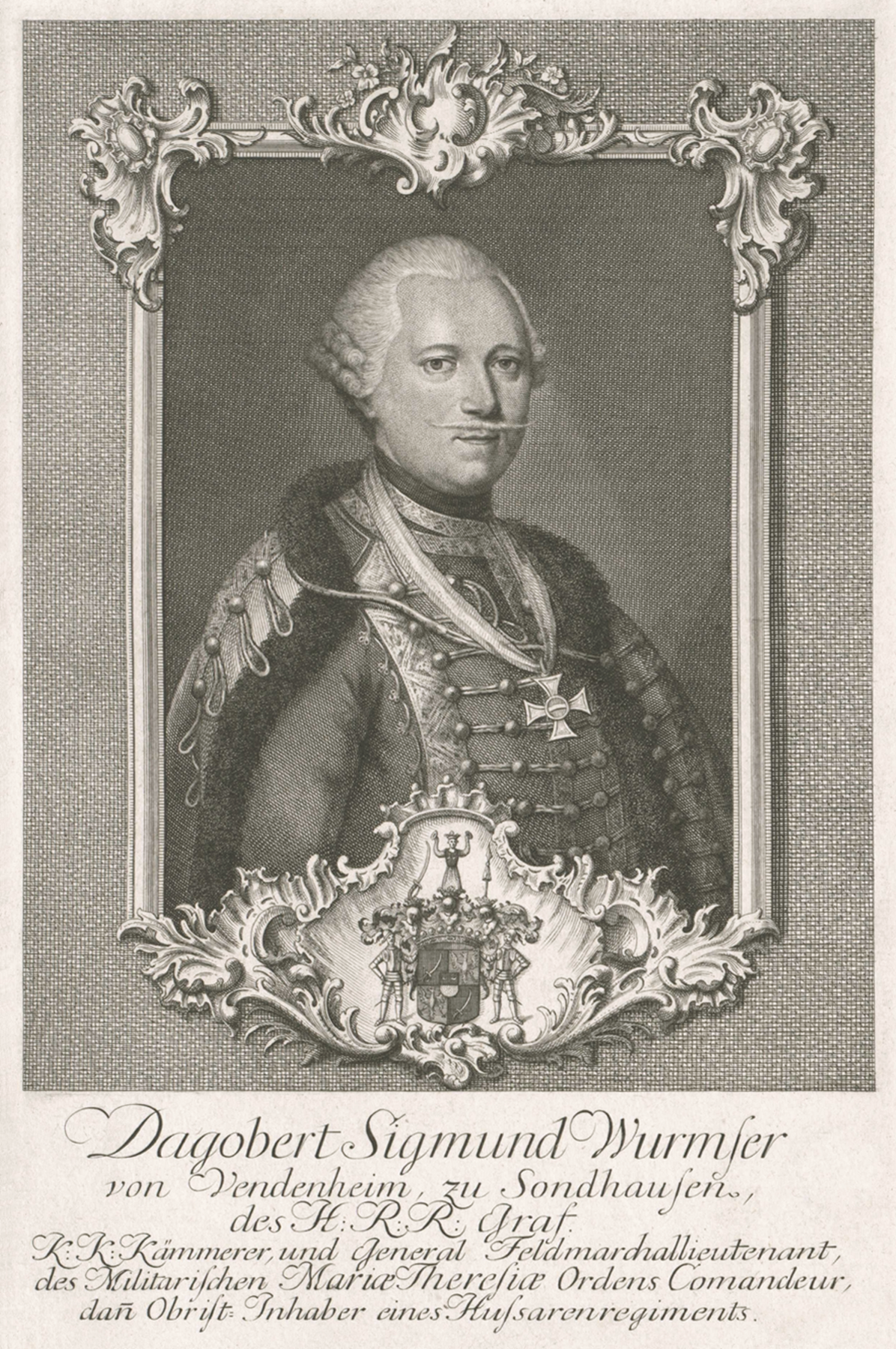
Dagobert von Wurmser

During this period, the Army of the Rhine's command structure remained chaotic. In July 1793, Adam Philippe Custine was replaced in command; he was guillotined at the end of August. General of Division (MG) Charles de Landremont became commander on 18 August and served until 29 September when he was arrested for treason. Unlike his predecessor MG Alexandre, vicomte de Beauharnais who was guillotined in July 1794, Landremont survived the experience, dying in 1818. MG Meunier took command for two days until his replacement by MG Jean Carlenc on 2 October. MG Charles Pichegru replaced Carlenc on 27 October. At the same time, MG Lazare Hoche assumed overall command of both the Army of the Moselle and Pichegru's Army of the Rhine.

On 20 August, a column made up of Habsburgs, Hessians, and French Émigrés clashed with 3,000 French at Jockgrim on the Rhine north of Lauterbourg. Feldmarschal-Leutnant Moritz Kavanaugh's Allied force included five infantry battalions, six light infantry companies, 13 cavalry squadrons, and 12 cannons. French General of Brigade Louis-Théobald Ilher led three battalions, six squadrons, and 10 guns. The Allies had the better of the encounter, losing 147 casualties. The French lost 103 men and 5 cannons captured, plus an unknown number of killed and wounded. While leading some dragoons, Ilher was killed by a Hessian Jäger. A flurry of actions followed as Wurmser drove in the French outposts and tapped at the main lines. Skirmishes occurred on 21 and 27 August, and on 7, 11, 12, 14, 19, 20, 23, and 30 September.

On 12 and 20 September, two battalions of the Kaiser Infantry Regiment led by Oberst (Colonel) Gerhard Rosselmini clashed with the French at Bad Bergzabern and Bienwaldmuhle.

== Battle ==
=== French Army ===
- Army of the Rhine: General of Division Jean Carlenc (45,312 infantry, 6,278 cavalry)
  - Advance Guard: General of Division Jean-Baptiste Meynier
    - Brigade: General of Brigade Augustin Isambert
    - Brigade: General of Brigade Ferette (?)
    - Brigade: General of Brigade Jean-François Combez
  - Right Wing: General of Brigade Paul-Alexis Dubois
    - Brigade: General of Brigade Claude Ignace François Michaud
    - Brigade: General of Brigade Claude Legrand
  - Center: General of Division Louis Dominique Munnier
    - Brigade: General of Brigade Martial Vachot
  - Center: General of Division Jean Nicolas Méquillet
    - Brigade: General of Brigade Bauriolle (?)
    - Brigade: General of Brigade Isambert
  - Left Wing: General of Division Claude Ferey
    - Brigade: General of Brigade Louis Desaix
  - Reserve: General of Division Dominique Diettmann
    - Brigade: General of Brigade Barthélemy de La Farelle
    - Brigade: General of Brigade Jean-François Ravel de Puycontal

=== Habsburg-Allied Army ===
- Allied Army: GdK Dagobert von Wurmser (33,599 infantry, 9,635 cavalry)
  - 1st Column: FML Christian, Prince of Waldeck und Pyrmont
    - Brigade: GM Adam Lichtenberg
    - Brigade: GM Karl Funk von Senftenau
  - 2nd Column: FML Friedrich Freiherr von Hotze
    - Brigade: OB Franjo Jelačić
    - Brigade: GM Alexander Jordis
    - Brigade: GM Karl Aufsess
  - 3rd Column: FML Hotze
    - Brigade: OBL Ignác Gyulay
    - Brigade: OB Johann von Klenau
  - 4th Column: GM Johann Mészáros von Szoboszló
    - Brigade: OB Sell von Pellegrini
    - Brigade: GM Johann Mészáros von Szoboszló
  - 5th Column: GM Karl Brunner von Hirschbrunn
  - 6th Column: GM Siegfried Kospoth
  - 7th Column: Louis Joseph de Bourbon, prince de Condé
    - Brigade: GM Viomenil
- Key
  - GdK = Austrian General der Kavallerie commands an army or corps
  - FML = Austrian Feldmarschal-Leutnant commands a corps or division
  - GM = Austrian General-Major commands a brigade
  - OB = Austrian Oberst (colonel) commands a regiment
  - OBL = Austrian Oberst-Leutnant (lieutenant colonel) is second in command of a regiment

=== Action ===
On 13 October 1793, Wurmser launched his main assault against the fortified French positions. The Allied forces succeeded in breaching the line, forcing a French withdrawal south to Hagenau. The French suffered 2,000 killed and wounded, plus 1,000 soldiers, 31 guns, and 12 colors captured. The Allies suffered 1,800 casualties. The day after the battle, an Allied force under Franz von Lauer laid siege to the nearby Fort-Louis in the Rhine river. The 4,500-man French garrison surrendered the fortress on 14 November. The French government quickly rushed Hoche's Army of the Moselle into the area to help drive back Wurmser. This move precipitated the Second Battle of Wissembourg in December 1793.

Preceded by Siege of Toulon (1793)	French Revolution: Revolutionary campaigns First Battle of Wissembourg (1793)	Succeeded by Battle of Truillas
