= Army of the Rhine (1791–1795) =

French revolutionary army

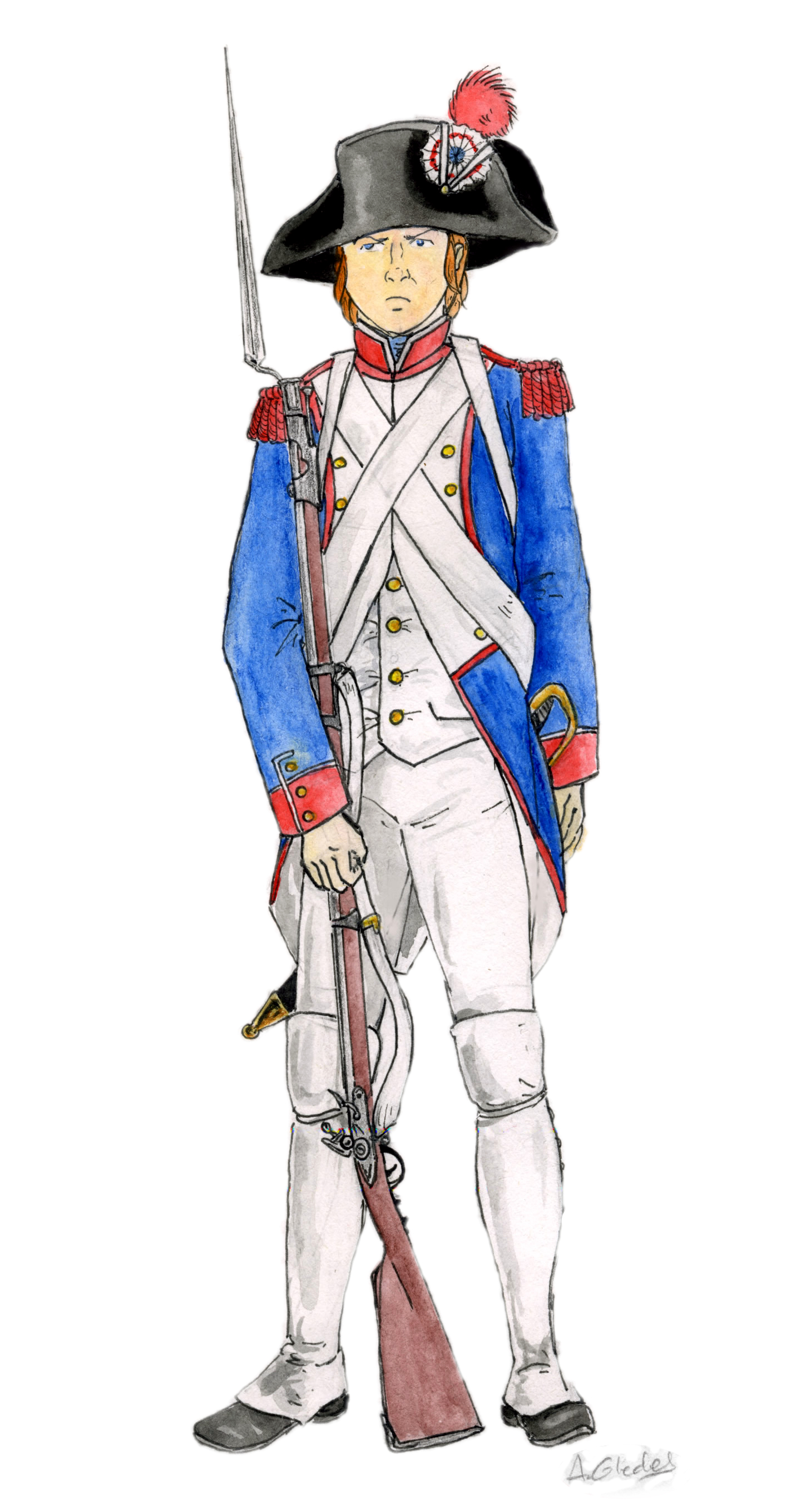
- Fusilier of a French Revolutionary Army
- Active: 1791–95, 1797–98, 1799–1801
- Disbanded: 20 April 1795
- Country: Kingdom of France (until 1792) (French First Republic) French Republic (from 1792)
- Allegiance: Kingdom of France; First Republic
- March: Chant de guerre pour l'Armée du Rhin

Commanders
- Notable commanders: Nicolas Luckner; Adam Philippe, Comte de Custine

The Army of the Rhine (French: Armée du Rhin; German: Rheinarmee) was formed in December 1791, for the purpose of bringing the French Revolution to the German states along the Rhine River. During its first year in action (1792), under command of Adam Philippe Custine, the Army of the Rhine participated in several victories, including Mainz, Frankfurt and Speyer. Subsequently, the army underwent several reorganizations and merged with the Army of the Moselle to form the Army of the Rhine and Moselle on 20 April 1795.

== Revolutionary Wars ==
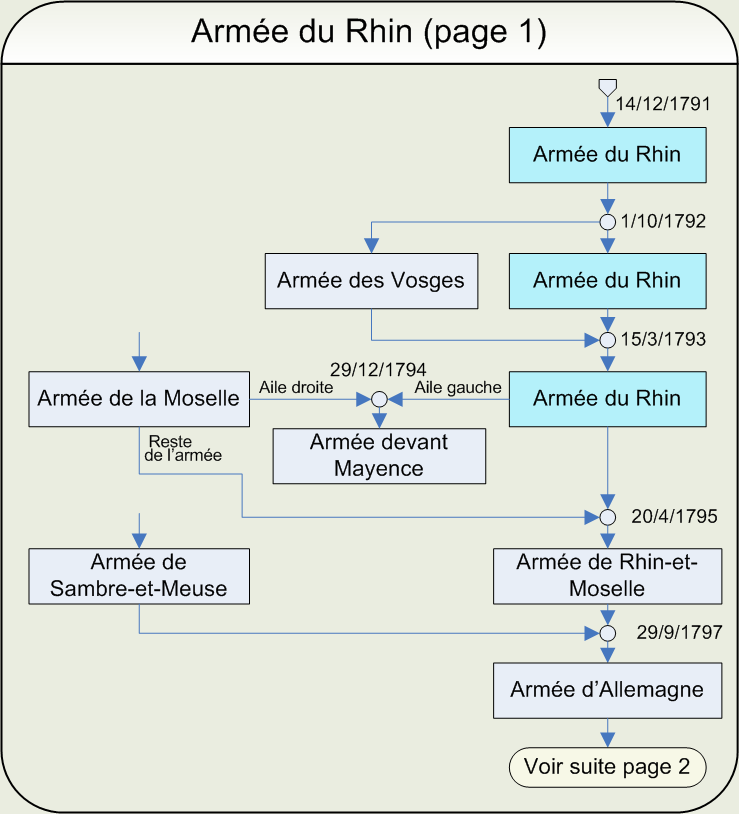
Organization of French Armies, 1791–1793

The Army of the Rhine (Armée du Rhin) was one of the main French Revolutionary armies operated in the Rhineland theater, principally in the Rhine River valley, from 1791 to 1795. At its creation, the Army of the Rhine had 88,390 men. It was formed on 14 December 1791, to defend France's eastern frontier in conjunction with two other armies, the Army of the North and the Army of the Center (name changed in October 1792 to Army of the Moselle). These armies were subdivided, fresh forces were raised and gradually grew until, by 30 April 1793, eleven armies encircled France on its coastal and the land frontiers. In October 1792, a portion of the army was used to form the Army of the Vosges but these units rejoined the Army of the Rhine on 15 March 1793.

=== Song of Glory ===
In the first months of fighting, victories for France were few. Although Custine had succeeded in driving the ecclesiastical authorities from the Swiss village of Porrentruy by 27 April 1792, this singular victory was accomplished largely through the enterprises of a local uprising assisted by some advanced guard and it was the last French victory for several weeks: subsequently, the borders of France had been assaulted by the Habsburgs and their allies. At Mons (18–29 April 1792), Tournay (29 April 1792), Bavay (17 May 1792), Rumegies (19 May 1792), Florennes 28 May 1792, and La Glisuelle, a village 5 kilometers (3 mi) north of Maubeuge (11 June 1792), Austrian skirmishers repeatedly defeated French forces.

Although much of the spring and summer of 1792 action continued throughout in the border regions with Belgium, the cities along the Upper Rhine, especially the city of Strasbourg, felt under threat of invasion by the Habsburg armies massing on the east side of the Rhine River. On 25 April 1792, Philippe Friedrich Dietrich, mayor of Strasbourg, asked a guest, Claude Joseph Rouget de Lisle, to compose a song to rally against the Habsburg threat. That evening, Rouget de Lisle wrote "Chant de guerre pour l'Armée du Rhin" (English: "War Song for the Army of the Rhine"), and dedicated the song to Marshal Nicolas Luckner, a Bavarian in French service. The melody soon became the rallying call to the Revolution: Allons enfants de la Patrie (Arise, children of the Fatherland)/Le jour de gloire est arrivé! (The day of glory has arrived!). It was renamed "La Marseillaise".

=== Successes under Custine's command ===
The French government ordered Luckner to take command of the Army of the North, and Custine replaced him as overall commander of the Army of the Rhine in Spring 1793. Under his experienced command, the Army took several important positions on the Rhine, including at Speyer, Mainz, Limburg and Frankfurt (see chart of battles below).

== Final reorganization ==
On 29 December 1794, the left wing of the Army and the right wing of the Army of the Moselle combined to form the Army besieging Mainz. The rest of the Army of the Moselle united with the Army of the Rhine on 20 April, to form the Army of the Rhine and Moselle. This army united with the Army of Sambre-et-Meuse to form the Army of Germany on 29 September 1797.

== Principal battles ==
Battles of the Army of the Rhine. 1792–1795
Date	Battle	Victor	Commander
28 April 1792	Battle of Porrentruy	France	Adam Philippe Custine
21 October 1792	1st Mainz	French	Custine
30 September 1792	Capture of Speyer	French	Custine
21 October 1792	Capture of Frankfurt	French	Custine
10 November 1792	Limburg	French	Custine, Houchard commanding the advanced guard.
2 December 1792	Frankfurt am Main	Coalition	Custine, GdB van Helden commanding the garrison force
14 April–23 July 1793	2nd Mainz	Coalition	Alexandre de Beauharnais
13 October 1793	1st Wissembourg	Coalition	Jean Pascal Carlenc
20 August–23 December 1793	Landau	French	Louis Lazare Hoche (Army of the Moselle); Jean-Charles Pichegru (Army of the Rhine)
18 November–22 December 1793	Haguenau	French	Pichegru
18–22 December 1793	Fröschwiller	French	Hoche
26–29 December 1793	2nd Wissembourg	French	Hoche and Pichegru
23 May 1794	2nd Kaiserslautern	Prussian-Saxon	Claude Ignace François Michaud
23 May 1794	Battle of Schifferstadt	French	Michaud
12–13 July 1794	Schänzel	French	Laurent de Gouvion Saint-Cyr
17–20 September 1794	3rd Kaiserslautern	Prussian-Saxon	François Ignace Schaal
25 December 1794	Battle of Mannheim bridge	French	Martial Vachot

== 1793 Order of Battle ==
In its five-year history, the Army had several Orders of Battle. This is the OOB at the beginning of the 1793 campaign.

=== Right wing ===
- Column Munnier

- National Guard

- 1st and 2nd Battalions Haute-Saône
- 2nd Battalion Nièvre
- 4th Battalion Vosges
- 4th Battalion Seine-et-Oise
- 3rd Battalion Bas-Rhin
- 2nd Battalion Puy-de-Dôme
- 1st, 3rd Battalions Ain
- 3rd Battalion Grenadiers de l'Indre-et-Loire
- 2nd Battalion Rhône-et-Loire

Total 20 battalions

=== Center ===
- Column Custine, positioned at Mainz.

- Grenadiers (1st, 2nd, 3rd and 4th battalions)
- 57th Infantry Regiment (two battalions)
- 62nd Infantry Regiment (one battalion)
- 82nd Infantry Regiment (one battalion)
- National Guard

- 2nd Battalion Ain
- 4th Battalion Haut-Rhin
- 9th and 10th Battalions Haute-Saône
- 4th Battalion Calvados
- 10th Battalion Meurthe
- 2nd Battalion Républicque
- 1st Battalion Chasseurs républicains
- 3rd, 7th, and 8th Battalions Vosges
- 5th and 6th Battalions Bas-Rhin
- 1st Battalion Fédérés Nationaux
- 2nd Battalion Seine-et-Oise

- 14th Cavalry Regiment (3 squadrons)
- 2nd Chasseurs à Cheval (light cavalry) (1 squadron)
- 7th Chasseurs à Cheval(4 squadrons)
- 10th Chasseurs à Cheval (5 squadrons)
Total 26 battalions, 12 squadrons

=== Left wing ===
Positioned at Bingen.

- 1st Infantry Brigade Neuwinger
Brigade Houchard

- 7th Light Infantry Regiment (1st Battalion)
- 36th Infantry Regiment (1 battalion)
- 37th Infantry Regiment (1 battalion)
National Guard
- 4th and 6th Battalions Jura
- 2nd Battalion Haute-Rhin
- 1st Battalion Seine-et-Loire
- 1st and 2nd Battalions Vosges

- 8th Chasseurs à Cheval (4 squadrons)

2nd Brigade Gilot
- 13th Infantry Regiment
- 48th Infantry Regiment
- National Guard

- 1st Battalion Haute-Rhin
- 1st Battalion Bas-Rhin
- 1st Battalion Correze
- 3rd Battalion Nievre

=== Cavalry ===
- Beaurevoir

- 2nd Chasseurs à Cheval (3 squadrons)
- 2nd Cavalry Regiment (3 squadrons
- 3rd Cavalry Regiment (3 squadrons)
- 9th Cavalry Regiment (3 squadrons)
- 11th Cavalry Regiment (3 squadrons)
- 12th Cavalry Regiment (3 squadrons)
Total 22 squadrons

=== Reserves ===
- Grenadiers (12 companies)
- 6th Battalion of Chasseurs
- 2nd Infantry Regiment
- 2nd Carbine Regiment (3 Squadrons)
- 16th Dragoon Regiment (3 squadrons)
- National Guard

- 6th, 10th and 13 Battalions Vosges
- 5th Battalion de l'Eure
- 6th Battalion Calvados
- 12h Battalion Haute-Saône
- Hussards de la Liberté (unknown )
- National Gendarmarie

Reserve totals 8 battalions, 12 squadrons, 2 platoons

== Commanders ==
Stability of command of the Army of the Rhine reflected the overall chaos of the French Revolutionary governments, especially in the years 1791–1794. Four of the generals serving in those years were guillotined (see chart below).

Commanders-in-Chief of the Army of the Rhine 1791–1795 Italics indicates general was guillotined during Reign of Terror
Date	Name
14 December 1791 – 6 May 1792	Nicolas Luckner
7 May – 20 July 1792	Alexis Magallon de la Morlière (intérim)
21 July – 25 December 1792	Armand Louis de Gontaut (also called "Biron") *
26 December 1792 – 14 March 1793,	Étienne Deprez-Crassier, interim and subordinate to Adam Philippe Custine, who commanded this and the Army of the Moselle
15 March – 17 May 1793	Custine, also commander of the Army of the Moselle until 19 April; he was removed from command of both armies on 29 July 1793, tried and executed in August.
18–29 May 1793	Dominique Diettmann, interim and subordinate to Jean Nicolas Houchard*
30 May – 17 August 1793	Alexandre de Beauharnais, provisionally and subordinate to Houchard.
18 August – 29 September 1793	Charles Hyacinthe Leclerc de Landremont, interim to 23 August, then provisionally
30 September – 1 October 1793	Louis Dominique Munnier (interim)
2–26 October 1793	Jean Pascal Raymond Carlenc (provisional)
27 October 1793 – 13 January 1794	Jean-Charles Pichegru, subordinate to Lazare Hoche
14 January 1794 – 10 April 1795	Claude Ignace François Michaud, during his absences, Jean Philippe Raymond Dorsner
4 December 1794 – 13 February 1795	Jean-Baptiste Kléber, subordinate to the Army of Mainz
14 February – 29 April 1795	François Ignace Schaal, subordinate to Army of Mainz
11–16 April 1795,	Jean-Baptiste Kléber (interim)
17–19 April 1795	Jean-Charles Pichegru, during assembly of the Armies of the Rhine and Moselle

== Other incarnations ==
An army of the Bourbon Restoration bore this name. In 1815 during the Hundred Days the V Corps – Armée du Rhin under the command of General Jean Rapp, was cantoned near Strassburg, and fought holding actions against contingents of Russians and Austrians, the largest of which was the Battle of La Suffel on fought on 28 June 1815.

This name was also used for the French military forces posted to Germany during the Occupation of the Rhineland (1919–1930), following the First World War.

== Related people ==
People known to have served in this Armée include:

- General Baraguey d'Hilliers
- General Custine
- Antoine Marie Chamans de Lavalette
- The utopian socialist Charles Fourier (1794–1795)
- General Victor Claude Alexandre Fanneau de Lahorie
- Jean Théophile Victor Leclerc
- General Louis-Théobald Ihler
- General François-Joseph Offenstein
- Captain Claude Joseph Rouget de Lisle writer of La Marseillaise
- General Charles Pichegru
- Balthazar Alexis Henri Schauenburg

== Sources ==
- Billington, James H. (2011), Fire in the Minds of Men: Origins of the Revolutionary Faith, Transaction Publishers, pp. 58–59, ISBN 978-1-4128-1401-0
- Chandler, David (1981) [1980], Waterloo: The Hundred Days, Osprey Publishing
- Chuquet, Arthur (1892), L'expédition de Custine (in French), L. Cert, pp. [ 5–6, 43
- Phipps, Ramsey Weston (2011) [1933], The Armies of the First French Republic: Volume II The Armées du Moselle, du Rhin, de Sambre-et-Meuse, de Rhin-et-Moselle, Pickle Partners Publishing
- Siborne, William (1895), "Supplement section", The Waterloo Campaign 1815 (4th ed.), Birmingham, 34 Wheeleys Road, pp. 767–780
- Smith, Digby (1996), Napoleonic Wars Data Book, Mechanicsburg, PA: Stackpole Books
- Stevens, Benjamin F. (January 1896), "Story of La Marseillaise", The Musical Record (408), Boston, Massachusetts: Oliver Ditson Company: 2
- Vautrey, Louis (1878), Histoire de Porrentruy (in French), J. Gürtler, pp. 225–227
- Weber, Eugen (1976), Peasants Into Frenchmen: The Modernization of Rural France, 1870–1914, Stanford University Press, p. 439, ISBN 978-0-8047-1013-8
