= Rudolf Eickemeyer =

German engineer, mathematician and French general

Rudolph Eickemeyer
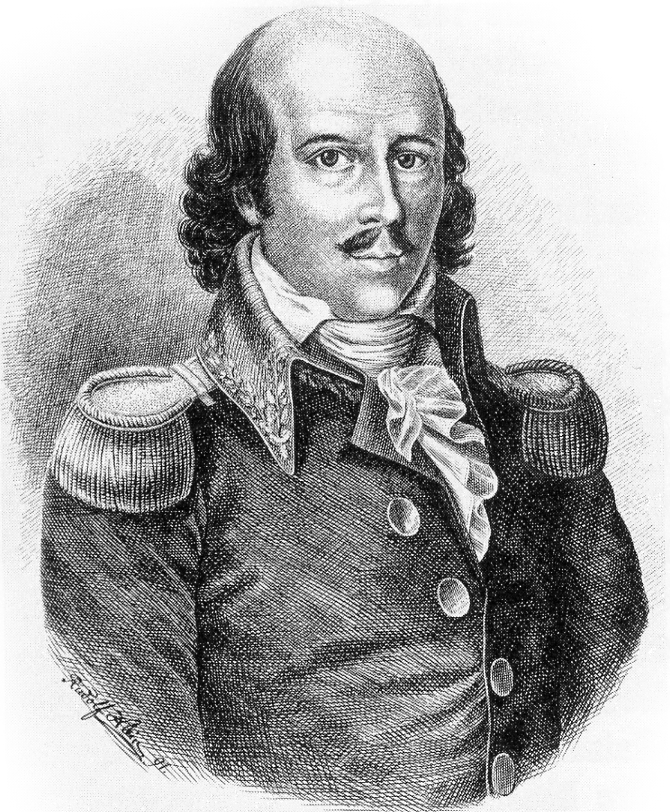
- Born: 11 March 1753; Mainz, Electorate of Mainz
- Died: 9 September 1825 (aged 72) Gau-Algesheim, Mainz-Bingen
- Allegiance: Electorate of Mainz; France; Grand Duchy of Hesse
- Branch: French Army
- Service years: 1791–1799
- Conflicts: French Revolutionary Wars
- Other work: Bürgermeister (mayor), Gau-Algesheim; Chamber of Deputies, Grand Duchy of Hesse

Jean Marie Rodolphe Eickemeyer (11 March 1753 - 9 September 1825), also called Heinrich Maria Johann Rudolf Eickemeyer, was an engineer, mathematician, and general of the French Revolutionary Wars. Eickemeyer was born in Mainz, and died in Gau-Algesheim, a town in the Mainz-Bingen district of present-day Rhineland-Palatinate.

Originally in the service of the Elector of Mainz, after the fall of Mainz in 1792, he served in the French Republican Army, attaining the rank of general of brigade, and commanded a division at the Siege of Kehl (1796–97). He left French service in 1799 and retired to Mainz, but found no employment there. He moved to his hometown, where he served two terms as mayor, and was elected as a deputy to the Chamber of the Grand Duchy of Hesse.

== Family and education ==
Eickemeyer's father came from Eichsfeld, and had studied mathematics in Göttingen and then at the ducal college in Mainz, and led him through his earliest studies, giving him a solid grounding in the sciences. In 1770, he entered the school of Artillery in the position of an officer. Before taking a position of professor of mathematics at the university, he went at the end of January 1775 to Paris, to study for a half year, and then visited the Netherlands and England. In particular, he study the workings of water and its relationship to military architecture. After his return to Mainz, he began to lecture, but was also in the military service and civil administration, gradually acquiring more responsibility and authority as he became a lieutenant colonel and director of hydraulics.

== Military career ==
By 1779, he was the chief engineering officer and had responsibility for the reinforcement and expansion of the Mainz fortifications, which were sadly depleted. However, the Elector of Mainz were adamantly against the investment in the strengthening of the Mainz fortifications, and not until after the outbreak of the French Revolution was there any interest in military affairs. The 1790 campaign against the insurgents of Liege was made; Eickemeyer also commanded the Elector's army, but by then it required so little of his time that he was able to resolve an engineering problem for the Munich Academy.

As early as 1791 the other monarchies of Europe watched with alarm the developments in France, and considered whether they should intervene, either in support of Louis XVI or to take advantage of the chaos in France. The key figure, the Holy Roman Emperor Leopold II, brother to the French Queen Marie Antoinette, had initially looked on the Revolution calmly. He became more and more disturbed as the Revolution became more radical, although he still hoped to avoid war. On 27 August 1791, Leopold and King Frederick William II of Prussia, in consultation with emigrant French nobles, issued the Declaration of Pillnitz, which declared the interest of the monarchs of Europe in the well-being of Louis and his family, and threatened vague but severe consequences if anything should befall them. Although Leopold saw the Pillnitz Declaration as a way of taking action that would enable him to avoid actually doing anything about France, at least for the moment, Paris saw the Declaration as a serious threat, and the revolutionary leaders denounced it.

The Elector of Mainz seemed unfazed by the military violence in France, but he eventually realized that the problems in France would spill into the Rhineland, especially when the Louis XVI's brothers and cousins were agitating for their restoration and using Mainz as a basis for counter-revolutionary action. Eickemeyer was charged with developing a plan for Mainz's defenses. Based on his proposal, the gates were reinstalled and the trenches repaired. In addition, palisades in the outer works improved Mainz's defensive capabilities. Work proceeded slowly, despite the launching of the campaign by the Holy Roman Emperor and the King of Prussia against the French Republic. When news arrived of the capture of Speyer by Custine, work elevated to a frenzy, as local leadership tried to catch up with great zeal on what they had not done in the previous ten weeks, and even ten years. Regardless of the pending panic, though, the Archbishop insisted that his own timbers be purchased to reinforce the walls, further lining his own pockets.

=== Siege of Mainz 1792 ===
As the French approached, the important defensive points were occupied and ready. In Mainz, though, there was panic: the regiments of the Duke of Nassau evacuated the fortress on October 5. The Elector, the gentry, the bishops, the aristocrats and their servants quickly left the city. It is estimated that between a quarter and a third of the 25,000 inhabitants fled. The rest of the population declared themselves ready to defend the decrepit fortifications. They had 5,000 volunteers, which was clearly insufficient to cover the city's huge physical plant.

Eickemeyer could see that although there were approximately 20,000 troops, they only had field artillery, not siege equipment, and a city the size of Mainz, even as poorly fortified as it was, would require specialty equipment. Custine sent word for a capitulation and the city fathers had a meeting on their situation. The French troops, now called Army of the Vosges by decision of the convention, began the encirclement and siege of the city on October 18. On that night, the vanguard of General Jean Nicolas Houchard reached Weisenau.

...One of our columns ... marched to within cannon shot of the town; the troops of Mainz, who lined the advanced works, fired and wounded few men. This operation complete, the howitzer batteries opened fire on the fort Hauptstein and the body of the place; but they were only field guns, and as the fortifications that surround the main forum for Mainz are very extensive, we quickly recognized the impossibility to wear down the city using six inch shells. The engineer commander Clémencey proposed to use red balls [fire balls]; Custine but laughed and said he would have the city without resorting to fire."

Custine had already been informed by the republicans among Mainz's inhabitants that the French had only to appear before the city to become its master. A civilian and military war council convened, to which were summoned the Baron of Stein, the Prussian Minister, Baron Fechenbach, canon of the cathedral chapter, Baron von Franz Joseph Albini, chancellor of the court, and M. de Kalckhoff, private adviser to the Prince Archbishop. These three dignitaries of the ecclesiastical court argued that it was necessary to defend Mainz, but the governor, the Prussian Minister and members of the Electoral body held a contrary opinion. In a final conference, the council decided to surrender.

Eickemeyer, who was fluent in French, went to Custine's headquarters with a sealed letter requesting the unrestricted emigration of individuals, and the pursuit of business as usual. Before delivery the letter, however, Eickemeyer was instructed to seek neutrality. Custine would not hear of such an offer, so Eickemeyer was obliged to hand over the Elector's letter, and bring an answer back to the city. He returned to the French camp a second time with a detailed contract; the fortress surrendered and the garrison agreed not to serve for a year against France.

Eickemeyer executed the capitulation, withdrawing the remaining troops. The jobs entrusted to him were hardly finished when he accepted Custine's offer of the rank of colonel in the French army. A week after the surrender of the fortress, he sent a letter to the Elector of Mainz, Karl Theodor von Dalberg and returned his officer's commission. It seemed to him that, in the prime of his life, he could expect for little advancement in service to an elector who would not even spend money on fortifications and who fled at the first hint of danger. On the other hand, the scope of significant activity under the banner of France seemed infinite.

=== French service ===
In French service, Eickemeyer was employed first in the Taunus region, where his local knowledge was useful in the maneuvers along the Nahe. After the defeats suffered there by the French, he retreated behind the Queich tributary with the rest of the French Army. He transferred to the Upper Rhine, promoted to brigadier general, and spent a short time in the previously Swiss territories. In the Fall 1793, he went to the French town of Belfort, where he evaluated the defenses and trained troops. In 1795, he was assigned to the besieging army at Mainz, and there he used his free time to write a short history on the capture of the fortress of Mainz by the French troops in 1792, which was printed two years later. In 1796, he belonged to the Army of the Rhine and Moselle, under Jean Victor Marie Moreau's command, and in the retreat across Germany he commanded the rear guard, which had several serious clashes with the Austrians. For most of 1796, he fought in the first division of Louis Desaix's Center, under the command of Delmas.

He was wounded in 1796 at the Siege of Kehl; after the surrender of Kehl, in 1797, he commanded a unit in the French interior for the next few years, first in the Jura, where he helped to put down a royalist insurgency, and then in the departments of Loire and Puy-de-Dôme. In 1799, though, he was removed from his post; he subsequently returned to Mainz, but found little work there.

=== Return to Mainz and retirement ===
In 1802, he was dismissed from all service in Mainz, and he retired to his hometown of Gau-Algesheim, near Bingen am Rhein, where he had a small property inherited from his father. There he used his leisure time to review some literary works, and to expand some scientific works he had once started, including treatises on subjects of political and military sciences (two volumes, published in 1817) and a textbook of military architecture (published in 1820). He took over as mayor of his village, and was renewed in this position in 1813. Under the new of the Grand Duchy of Hesse, the successor to the Imperial Mainz, he was elected as a member of the provincial council of Rheinhessen; his health had gradually weakened, and he could not finish his participation in the creation of the new Constitution, and he died in Gau-Algesheim on 9 September 1825. His autobiography was published under the title "Memoirs of General E." and accompanied a few pages on the recent fate of the author.

== Military service ==
- Officer of artillery: 1770
- Officer of engineering and artillery, Mainz: 1789
- Adjudant-colonel: 30 October 1792
- Général of brigade: 15 May 1793
