= Breton Chasseurs =

Breton Chasseurs 6th Battalion of Chasseurs (Bretons)
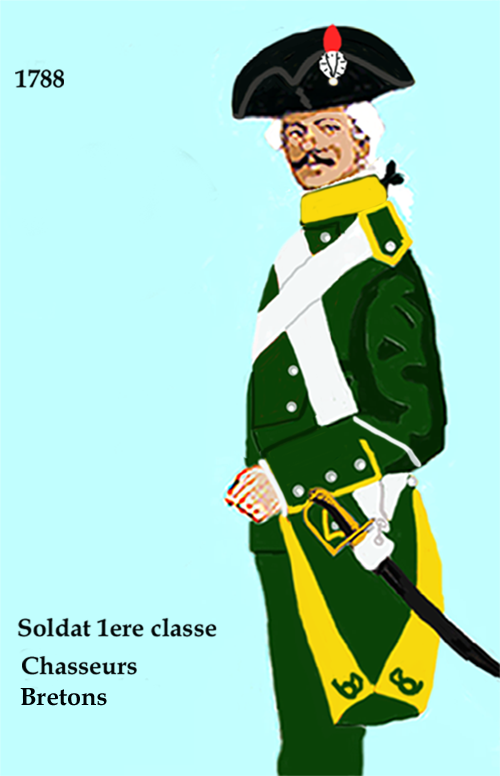
- Regimental uniform after formation in 1788.
- Active: 1788–1795
- Country: Kingdom of France; First French Republic
- Branch: (Kingdom of France) Armée Royale (France) Armée Française
- Type: Chasseurs à Pied
- Size: Battalion
- Part of: Brittany Inspectorate
- Dépôt: Lorient, Brittany

Insignia
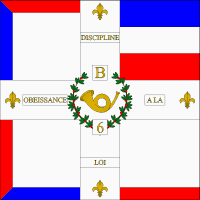
- 1791 Colours

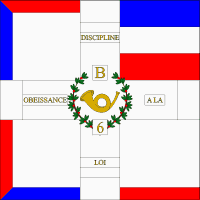
- 1793 Colours

The Breton Chasseurs (French: Chasseurs Bretons [ʃasœʁ bʁətɔ̃]) was a chasseur battalion of the French Royal Army which was created just before the French Revolution. The battalion would see service in the initial stages of the conflict, but the lineage ended after it was amalgamated with other volunteer units. The battalion's successor, the 81st Infantry Regiment would continue to serve in the modern French Army until 2010 when it was disbanded.

== Background and formation ==
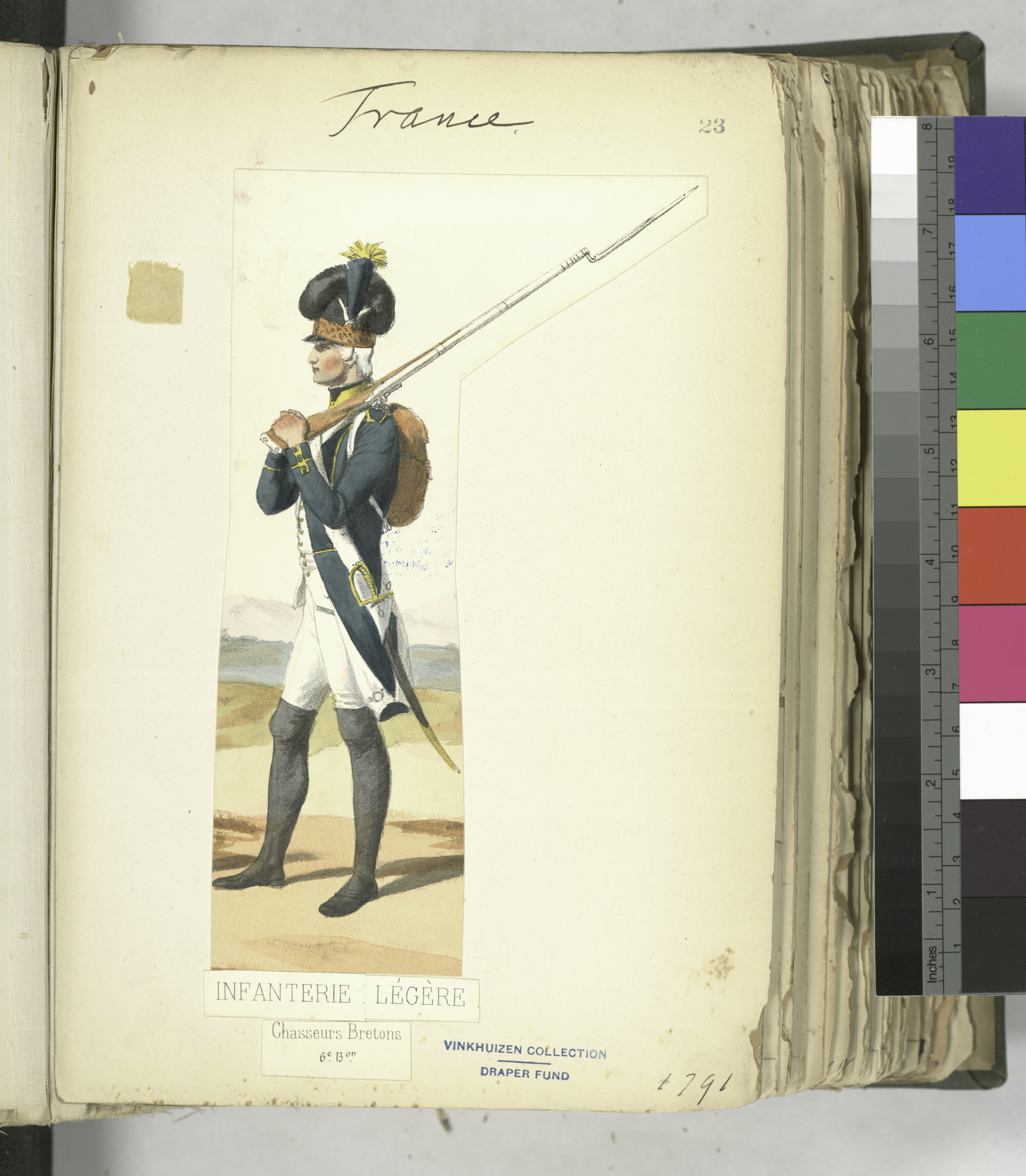
Soldat of the Breton Chasseurs in uniform sometime between 1791 and 1792, the uniform is that of the post-1789 ordnance.

Following the 8 August 1784 army ordnance, several regiments of 'Chasseurs à Cheval', literally Chasseurs of Horse or Mounted Chasseurs were formed. The infantry companies of these regiments were grouped into four battalions, and attached to their respective regiment, leaving six battalions by the end of the year. However, these new massive regiments proved to be too costly and too 'heavy', so a new ordnance was decreed just four years after their formation.

Following the 17 March 1788 ordnance, the entirety of the Light Corps or Corps Léger as it became known was completely reorganised. The new ordnance decreed the separation of the corps into two new separate corps, the Light Cavalry Corps or Corps de Cavalerie Léger and the Chasseur Corps or Corps de Chasseurs. The infantry itself was reorganised into twelve new chasseur battalions each composed of four companies, one depot company, and 12 riflemen. By the time of the revolution, the Chasseur Corps had a combined strength of 4,500 men.

== Before the Revolution ==
The Chasseurs Bretons were formed on 1 May 1788 in Lorient, Brittany from the four infantry companies of the Chasseurs à Cheval des Alpes. The new battalion was 6th in precedence, just after the Cantabres Chasseurs and before the Auvergne Chasseurs. The regimental staff or État-Major was composed of the following: 1 lieutenant colonel (commander), 1 major, 1 quartermaster-treasurer, 1 adjutant, 1 surgeon-major, music section (1 drum major and 4 musicians), 1 master tailor, 1 master armourer, and 1 master cobbler. Each company was decreed to be organised as follows: 1 captain commandant, 1 second captain, 1 first lieutenant, 1 second lieutenant, 2 port drapeaus (literally flag holders), 1 sergeant major, 1 corporal fourrier, 4 sergeants, 8 corporals, 8 appointés, 78 chasseurs (12 riflemen), and 2 drummers. This left a total of 108 troops, not including the two attached officers or officer cadets assigned. The battalion was also divided into five companies (four field), while the last (fifth) remained at the regimental depot as a recruitment and training unit.

The regiment's first uniform consisted of; black tricone (officers in bicorne), yellow turnbacks, dark green jacket, dark green breeches, dark green gaiters, black boots, dark green pockets, yellow trimmed dark green pockets, yellow trimmed dark green cuffs, yellow cuff flaps, and white buttons. The carabiniers (sharpshooters) uniforms were the same as the line troops, but had a large capped bearskin with a red top patch with a white cross, red flaming grenades on the turnbacks, red epaulettes, and a red plume on the left side of the cap along with a white cord on the left side.

Immediately after its formation, the battalion moved to Belle Île and the next year went to Rochefort-en-Terre. In 1789, it occupied the island of Oléron, and in November 1790 detached a company to Saint-Jean-d'Angély, where quite serious disturbances had broken out. Soon the entire battalion was in the town, where it spent the year of 1791.

In 1789, the chasseurs' uniforms were altered into the following: buttons were now to be of brass and the coat was piped in white. The turnbacks were to be in yellow, with green hunting horns. Small clothes and belts were white and gaiters black. Musicians worse reversed colours. The carabiniers section (later company) wore red epaulettes and bearskins with red plumes, white cords, a red top patch with a white cross and no front plate. The chasseurs worse the peaked casque, with stiff black horsehair crest and mock leopard skin turban. On the left-hand side were a brass hunting horn badge, a company pompom and the tricolour cockade. For parades a white plume, tipped in yellow was worn.

== Revolution ==
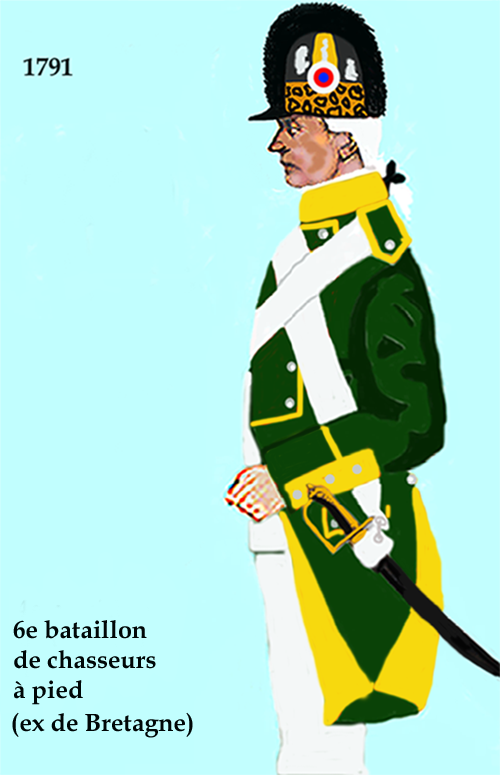
Regimental uniform after the 1791 provisional regulations, showing the new casque helmet.

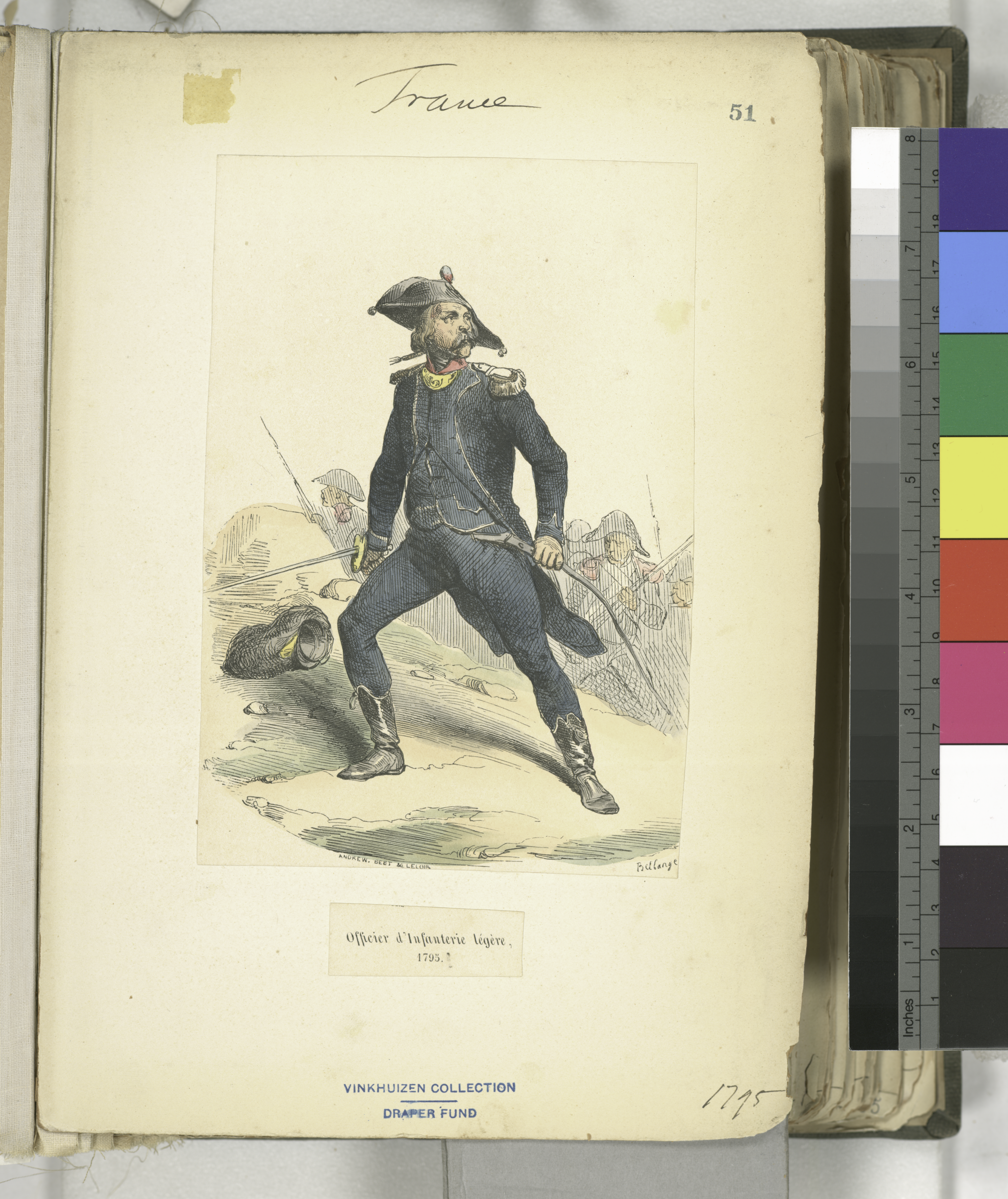
Officer of the light infantry following the 1793 uniform changes. The uniform was dramatically changed from the muddy-green to the dark-blue of the older republic era.

On 1 April 1791, provisional regulations were announced following the initial stages of the French Revolution, and the regiment renamed as the 6th Battalion of Chasseurs (Bretons) (6ème Bataillon de Chasseurs (Bretons)), but they continued to be known as their former title until 1792. In addition to the new title, the regiment adopted a new uniform; peak casque, with stiff black horsehair crest and mock leopard skin turban casque, yellow turnbacks, dark green jacket, dark green breeches, dark green gaiters, black boots, dark green pockets, yellow trimmed dark green pockets, yellow trimmed dark green cuffs, yellow cuff flaps, and white buttons.

In the beginning of 1792, the regiment was directed towards Strasbourg where it was to join the vanguard of the Army of the Rhine (Armée du Rhin). The regiment had the distinction of being the first to attack the Prussian entrenchments on the heights of the Chapelle Sainte-Anne, and charged with bayonets at the ready and pushed the majority of the opposing force out of the entire area. Upon joining the army, reports show the battalion as being based in the department of Bas-Rhin and being only 375 in strength, more than 200 under-strength.

Following the failures of the initial campaigns in 1792, the National Assembly called for the expansion of the chasseurs corps. Therefore, on 24 April 1792 a decree was passed which called for the expansion of the chasseur battalions to nine companies and a new carabinier elite company (formed from the company carabinier sections).

In addition to the expansion of the battalions, new uniform were decreed, though these were short lived because of the impending first round of amalgamations. In September 1793 the chasseurs changed their green coats for the same dark blue as was now worn in the line, with pointed lapels, white piping, yellow buttons, red collar and cuff flaps. Small clothes were dark blue and white belts. The headgear was a green leather casque. In addition, the chasseurs began to receive new smooth-bore short muskets, the same as the line while the rifled carbines were granted to the carabiniers.

Finally, on 25 June 1795, the battalion was transferred to Belfort and joined the Army of the Alps.

Following the declaration of the Republic in 1791, the Republicans had wanted to remove the old royalist stain, with the first changes occurring in 1791 when the old provincial titles were replaced by numbers. In 1793, the wave of volunteers were grouped with the more experienced line battalions to form new demi-brigades. These new units were the three battalion regiments organised so that there were two of volunteers and one of experienced troops. This meant in battle, the experienced troops would be in the middle to keep the less-experienced wings under control.

Therefore, on 25 June 1795, the 6th Chasseurs Battalion was amalgamated with the 8th Calvados Volunteer Battalion and 4th Saône-et-Loire Volunteer Battalion to form the new 6th Light Demi-Brigade (6éme Demi-Brigade Légère). It was at this point that the royalist lineage was ended, and subsequently became the 2nd Battalion of the new demi-brigade.

== Commanding officers ==
Commanding officers of the regiment were:

- 1788–1791: Jean Baptiste Marie Joseph Florimond de Cappy
- 6 November 1791 – 23 March 1792: Thomas O'Meara
- 23 March 1792 – 1795: Joseph Gillot
