= Army of the Vosges (1792–1793) =

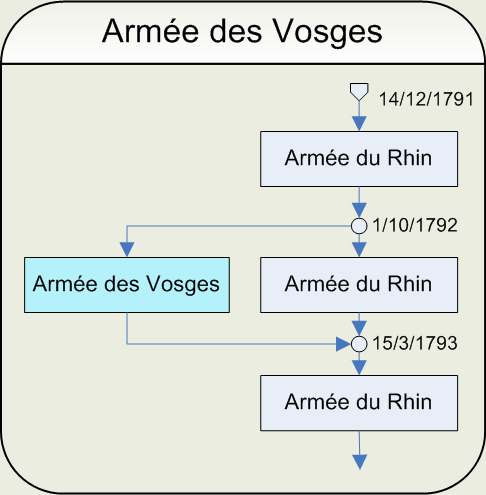

The Army of the Vosges (armée des Vosges) was a short-lived French Revolutionary Army formed on 1 October 1792 by splitting off the Expeditionary Corps of the Army of the Rhine, under the command of Adam Philippe de Custine.

== History ==
Intended for an expedition outside the French borders, it invaded the Palatinate and seized Spire and Mainz. The conquered territory became its zone of occupation. On 1 January 1793, Custine designated the Lauter River as the line of demarcation between the Armies of the Rhine and the Vosges.

On 1 March 1793, the Conseil exécutif decided that the Army of the Vosges should be merged with the Army of the Rhine again, and Custine was replaced by Hugues Alexandre Joseph Meunier, who organised the transition. On 14 March, the Army of the Vosges had ceased to exist.

== See also ==
- French Revolutionary Army
