= Chasseur =

French military designation

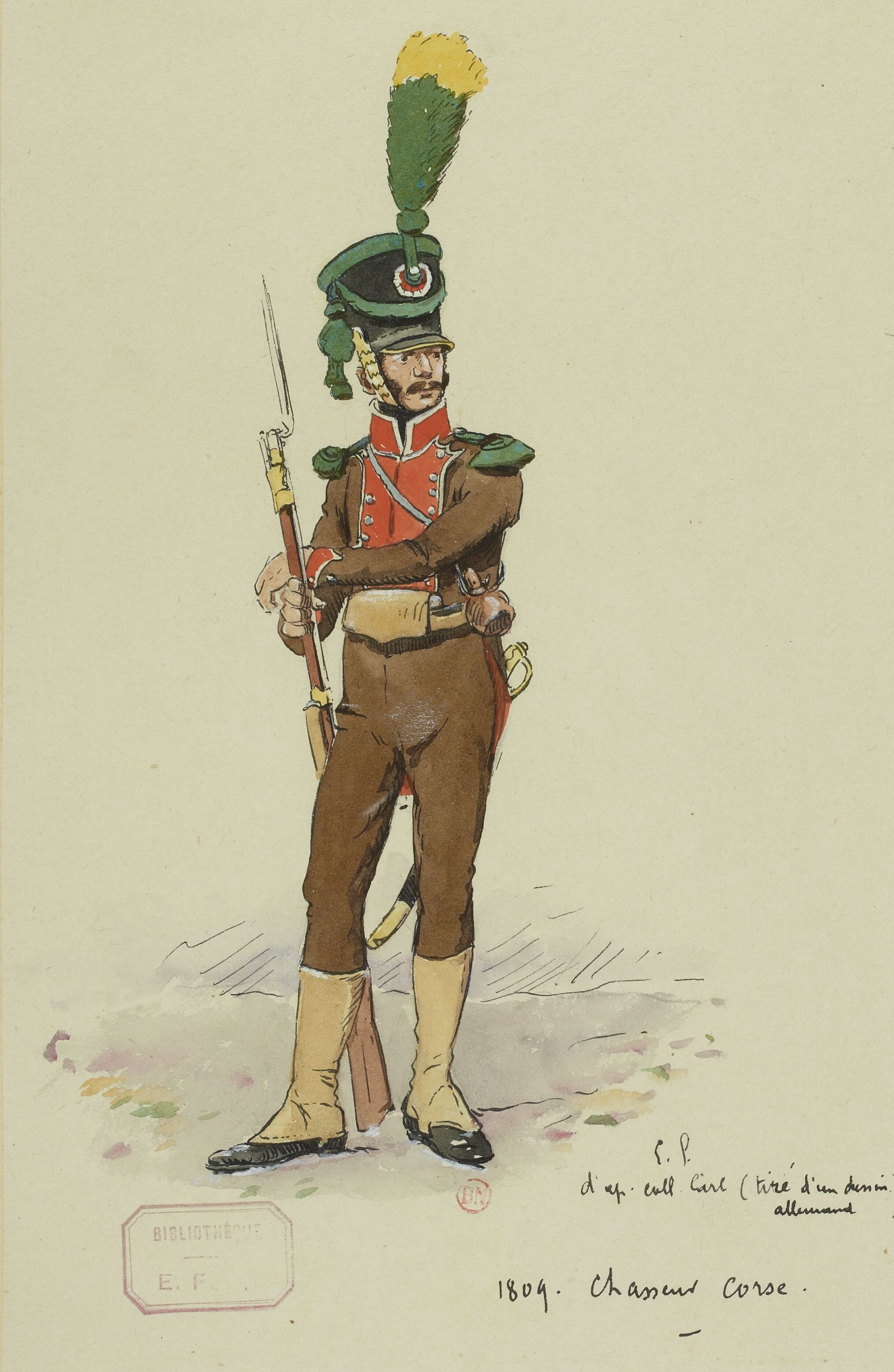
A French Imperial Army chasseur in 1804

Chasseur (/ʃæˈsɜːr/ shass-UR, French: [ʃasœʁ]), a French term for "hunter", is the designation given to certain regiments of the French and Belgian light infantry (chasseurs à pied) or light cavalry (chasseurs à cheval) to denote troops trained for rapid action.

== French Army ==
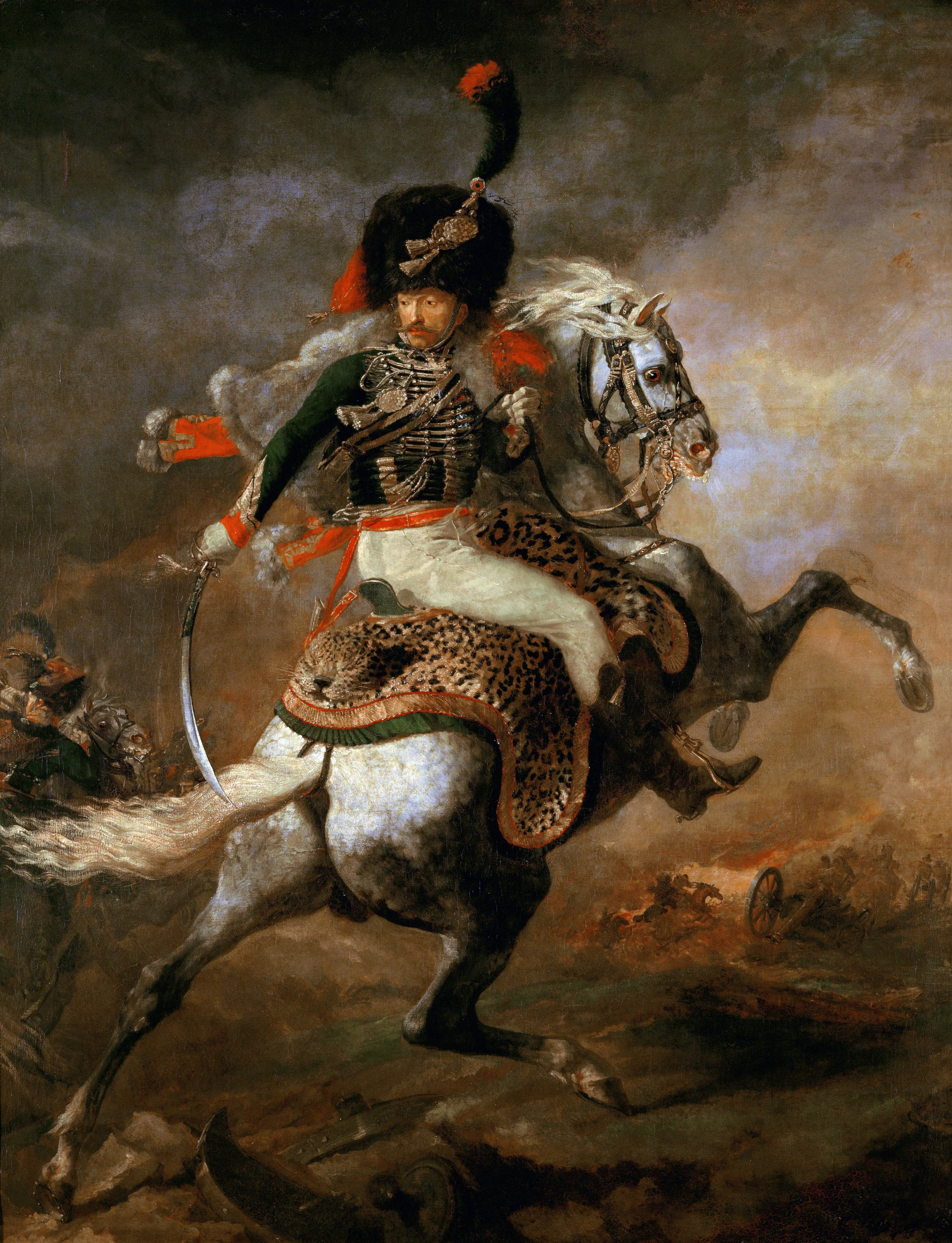
c. 1812 painting of a Mounted Chasseurs of the Imperial Guard officer

The chasseurs are a branch of the French Army that originated during the War of the Austrian Succession, when, in 1743, Jean Chrétien Fischer was authorised by the Marshal de Belle-Isle to raise a 600-strong mixed force of infantry and cavalry, which was called the Chasseurs de Fischer.

During the remainder of the 18th century, various types of light troops (troupes légères) were employed within the French Army, either as independent units or as companies within existing regiments. In 1788, there were eight battalions of chasseurs, which was in March 1793 expanded to 21 battalions. The battalions of chasseurs in 1788 were the following:

- (1st) Chasseurs Royaux de Provence
- (2nd) Chasseurs Royaux de Dauphiné
- (3rd) Chasseurs Royaux Corses (Corsican)
- (4th) Chasseurs Corses (Corsican)
- (5th) Chasseurs Cantabres (Cantabrian)
- (6th) Chasseurs Bretons
- (7th) Chasseurs d'Auvergne
- (8th) Chasseurs des Vosges
- (9th) Chasseurs des Cévennes
- (10th) Chasseurs du Gèvaudan
- (11th) Chasseurs des Ardennes
- (12th) Chasseurs du Roussillon

=== Chasseurs à pied ===
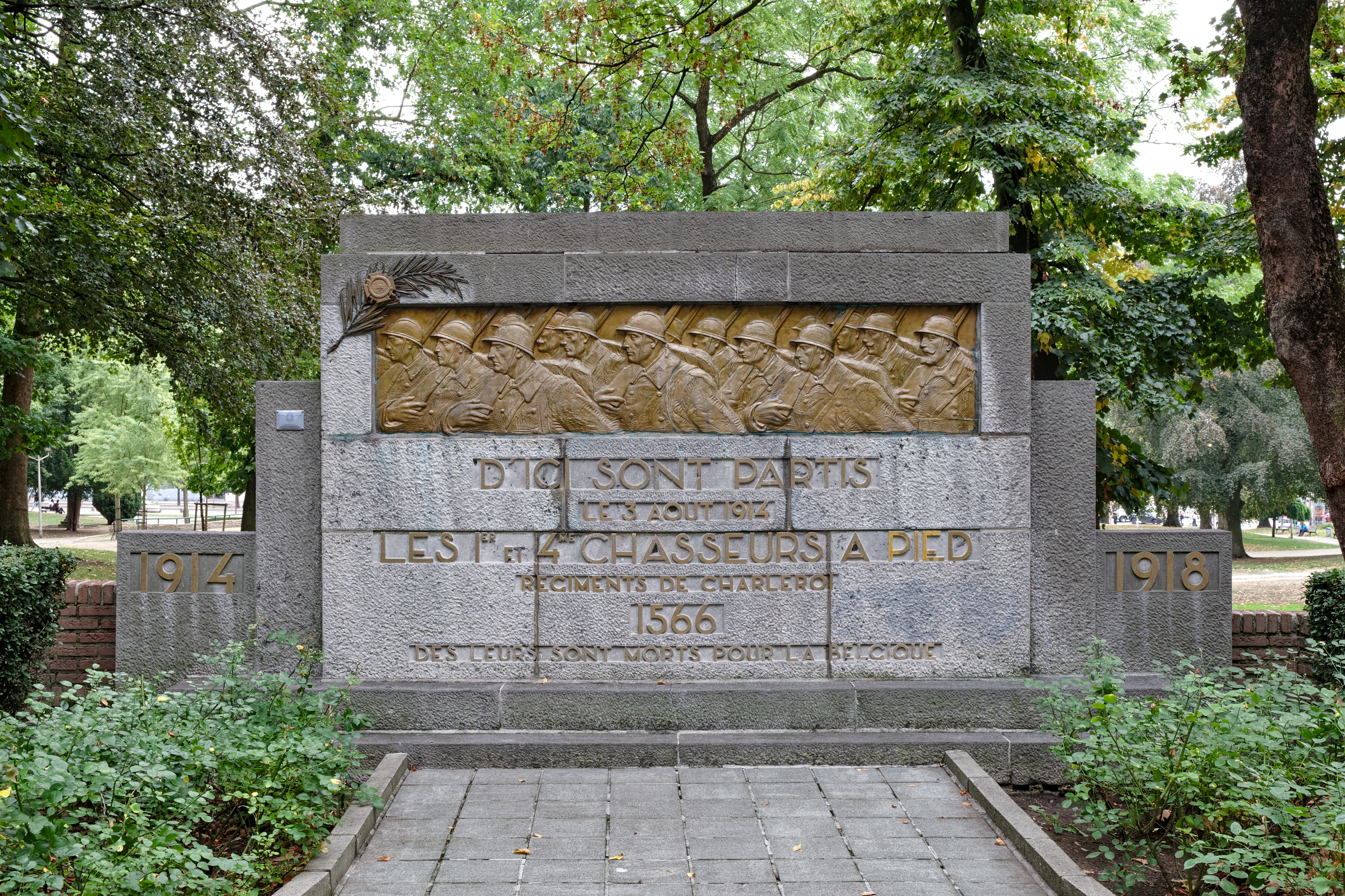
Memorial in Charleroi to the chasseurs à pied who fought in World War I

The chasseurs à pied were the light infantrymen of the French Imperial Army. They were armed the same as their counterparts in the regular line infantry (fusilier) battalions but were trained to excel in marksmanship and in executing manoeuvres at high speed.

From 1840, the chasseurs à pied wore a long-skirted frock coat. After 1850, however, they adopted a uniform consisting of a short frock coat with slits in the sides on the bottom edge to allow for better freedom of movement than the previous design. They also wore light blue baggy trousers (in contrast to the red of the line infantry) which were tucked into jambières (leather gaiters). The other light infantry unit type, the voltigeurs, specialised as skirmishers and the advance screening of the main force. The chasseurs could also be called upon to form advance guards and scouting parties alongside the voltigeurs.

After the Napoleonic Wars, the chasseurs à pied continued to exist as a separate corps within the infantry. Initially a specially trained elite, they eventually had a tactical role that came to match that of the ordinary lignards (line infantry).

By the late 19th century, the differences between the two branches were confined to uniform and insignia although the chasseurs retained a strong esprit de corps. Immediately after the Franco-Prussian War, it was argued that the continued existence of a nominally elite class of infantry, whuch was in fact armed and trained to the same standards as the ordinary soldier, was contrary to both military utility and the egalitarian principles of the new republic. However, public opinion, influenced by the occasions on which the chasseurs had distinguished themselves during the war, was opposed to the disbanding of the distinctive corps.

Under the Third Republic the chasseurs à pied were increased from 20 to 30 battalions. Four of them saw active service in Tunisia, one in Indochina between 1880 and 1896. Twelve of the chasseur battalions were redesignated as mountain infantry (chasseurs alpins). The remaining chasseur battalions were deployed near the frontier with Germany as part of the troupes de couverture, who were charged with covering the bulk of the army during mobilisation.

During World War I, the French Army maintained 31 battalions of infantry chasseurs, as well as a varying number of reserve and territorial units. Each infantry division was expected to include at least one battalion of either chasseurs à pied or chasseurs alpine. Each battalion had an establishment of 1,300 to 1,500 men. They were reportedly nicknamed schwarze Teufel ("black devils") by their German opponents in reference to their dark coloured uniforms. The chasseurs served mainly on the Western Front, but detachments were sent to reinforce the Italian front in 1917.

=== Chasseurs à cheval ===
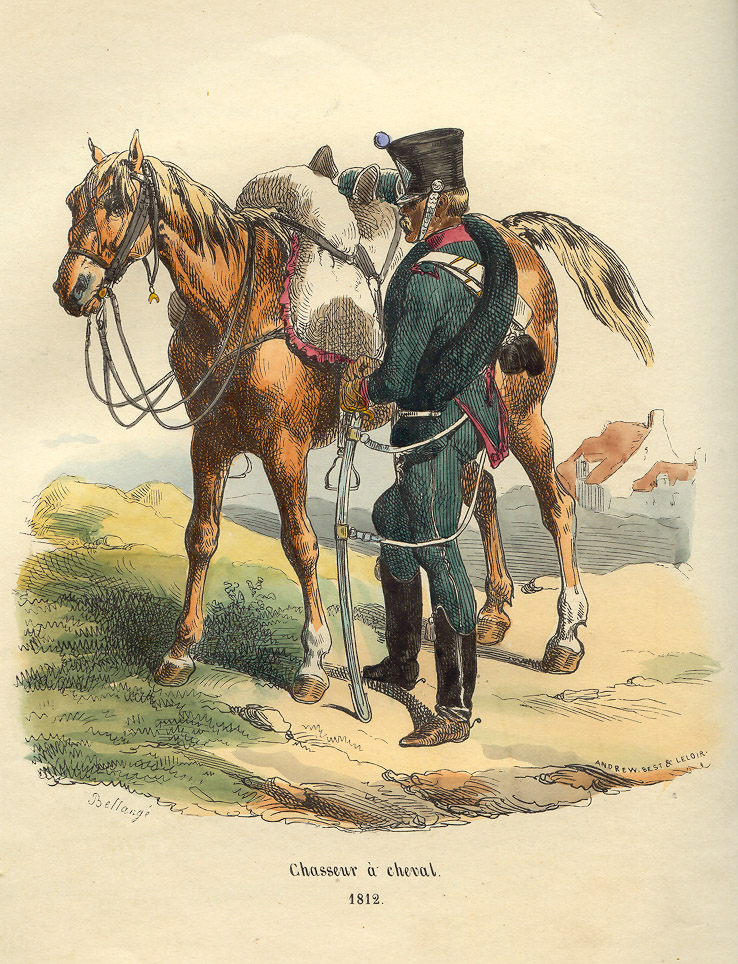
A French chasseur à cheval in 1812

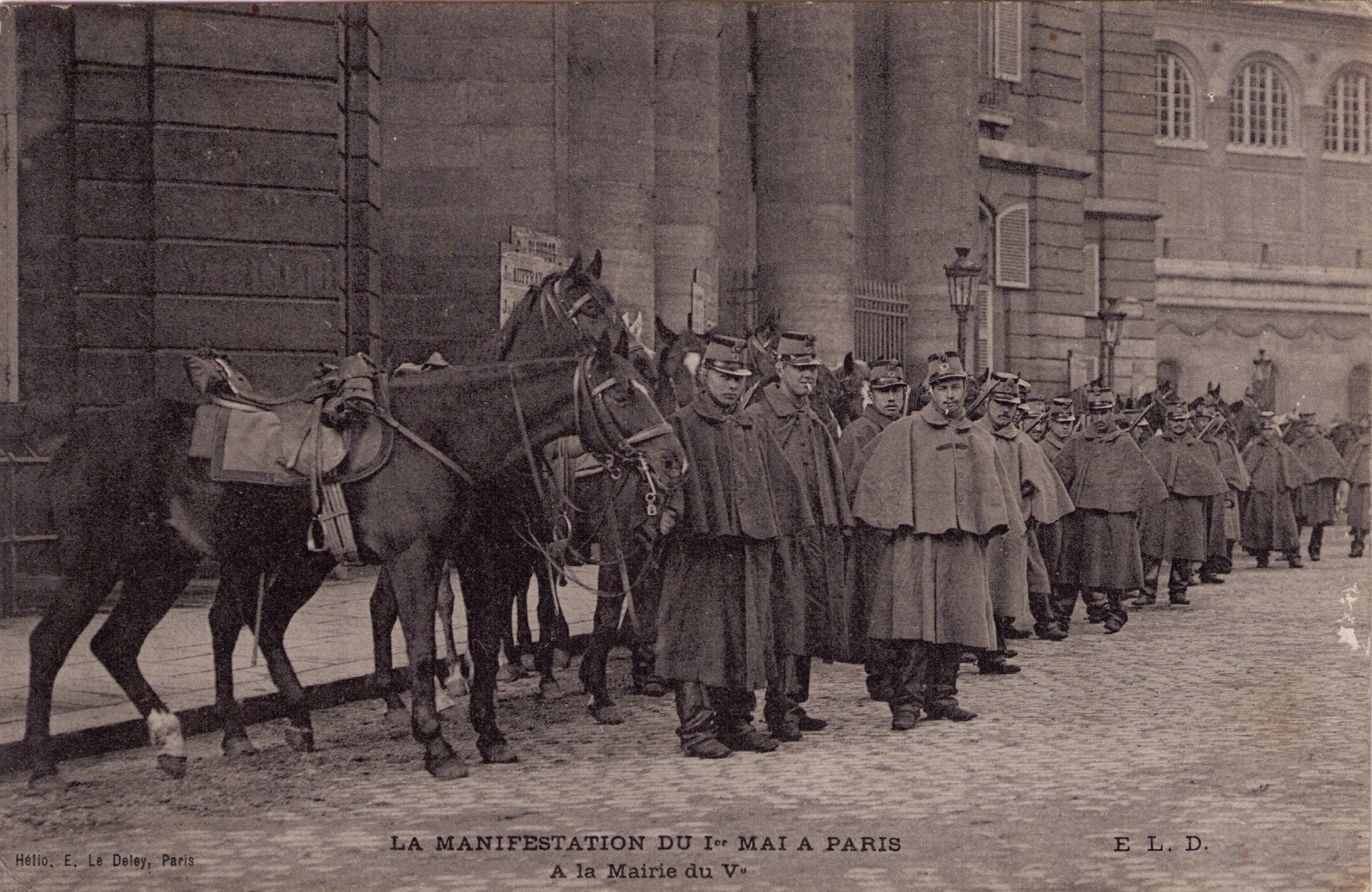
Chasseurs à cheval in Paris, 1906

The chasseurs à cheval, a type of French light cavalry, date from 1743 when an independent unit (Fischer's Volunteer Company of Chasseurs) was raised during the War of the Austrian Succession to counter Trenck's Pandurs and Croats employed as irregulars by the Austrian army. Originally a mixed corps of light infantry and horsemen, this force proved sufficiently effective to warrant the creation of a single corps: Dragoons-chasseurs de Conflans. In 1776 this and other volunteer "legions" had their mounted elements converted into 24 squadrons of chasseurs à cheval, each of which was attached to one of the existing dragoon regiments of the royal cavalry. In 1779 these squadrons were amalgamated into six regiments, each of which was given a regional title (1st Chasseurs des Alpes, 2nd Chasseurs des Pyrenees, etc.). In 1788, 6 dragoon regiments were converted to chasseurs à cheval and during the period of the Revolutionary Wars the number was again increased, to 25.

During their earlier history these regiments lacked the higher profile of the identically armed (but much more lavishly uniformed) hussars. Distinguished by dark green uniforms and a bugle-horn badge, they were frequently used as advance scouting units providing valuable information on enemy movements. Both Napoleon's Imperial Guard and the Royal Guard of the Restoration included a regiment of chasseurs à cheval. In addition Napoleon added a further five line regiments to those inherited from the Revolutionary period. At the beginning of the Franco-Prussian War of 1870, the French Army had 12 regiments of chasseurs à cheval, grouped with eight hussar regiments to form the light branch of the cavalry and tasked with primarily reconnaissance duties. This intended role continued through World War I and the chasseurs à cheval remained entirely horse mounted until the 1^{er} RCh was motorised in June 1940. Disbanded after the Battle of France, these units were reconstituted in 1944–45 as light armour.

During the 19th century, several regiments of chasseurs d'Afrique were raised in French Algeria. They were light cavalry and recruited originally from French volunteers and subsequently from the French settlers in North Africa doing their military service. As such, they were the mounted equivalent of the zouaves.

=== Flanqueurs-Chasseurs ===
In preparation for the invasion of Russia, Napoleon ordered the creation of additional units for the Guard that included the Régiment de Flanqueurs-Chasseurs de la Garde. It was recruited mainly from the sons and nephews of forest service civil servants or made up of young men who wanted to obtain a position within the Waters and Forests Administration after concluding their military service.

The role of the light infantry soldiers was to flank the main army while on the march to guard against any sudden attack.

=== Chasseurs forestiers ===
The chasseurs forestiers (forest huntsmen) were militarized units of the Eaux et Forêts administration (Waters and Forests Administration). They were organized in 18 companies and many sections. The chasseurs forestiers existed between 1875 and 1924. The chasseurs forestiers were classed as light infantry troops and could form advance guards and scouting parties due to their knowledge of natural fields and their ability to make or read maps.

Established by a decree of the newly established Third Republic dated 2 April 1875, the chasseurs forestiers incorporated some personnel of the existing Water and Forest Administration into the French Army on a part-time basis. The purpose was to make use of trained and specialist manpower as part of the armed forces in time of war. The specific roles envisaged for the chasseurs forestiers were to provide guides for the regular army and to work with the Engineers in obtaining stocks of timber for military use.

While provided with distinctive green and grey uniforms plus stocks of standard infantry weapons and equipment, the chasseurs forestiers performed their normal forestry service functions in peacetime, with only limited involvement in army training and manoeuvers. Upon mobilisation in August 1914, personnel aged between 25 and 48 years saw front line service in the Vosges, in northern France. Post-war policy changes led to the disestablishment of the Chasseurs Forestiers as a military body in 1924.

=== Today ===
The modern French Army still maintains chasseurs à pied (mechanized infantry: 16^{e} BC), chasseurs-alpins (mountain troops: 7^{e}, 13^{e}, 27^{e} BCA) and regiments of chasseurs à cheval (1^{er}-2^{e} RCh and 4^{e} RCh: light armoured regiments). In addition one regiment of chasseurs d'Afrique (training unit: 1^{er} RCA) has been re-raised to commemorate this branch of the French cavalry. Since May 1943 there has been a "Régiment de Chasseurs Parachutistes" (1^{er} RCP).

All of these units have different traditions:

- Bataillons de chasseurs are light infantry units created after 1838. Some of these battalions were converted to specialized mountain units as Bataillons de Chasseurs Alpins in 1888, as an answer to the Italian Alpine (Alpini) regiments stationed along the Alpine frontier.
- Régiments de chasseurs are units of the "Arme Blindée Cavalerie": armoured units. The basic organic unit is called regiment and not bataillon to avoid confusing cavalry and infantry chasseurs.
- The airborne infantry units called Régiments de chasseurs parachutistes were created in 1943 with airborne troops from the French Airforce (GIA or Groupe d'Infanterie de l'Air), who were transferred into the Army.
- Chasseurs Alpins are the elite mountain infantry of the modern French Army. They are trained to operate in mountainous terrain and to undertake urban warfare.

Although the traditions of these different branches of the French Army are very different, there is still a tendency to confuse one with the other. For example, when World War I veteran Léon Weil died, the AFP press agency stated that he was a member of the 5th "Régiment de Chasseurs Alpins". It was in fact the 5th Bataillon.

== Belgian Army ==
From its creation as a permanent force in 1832, the Belgian Army included regiments of both chasseurs à pied and chasseurs à cheval, performing the same roles as their French counterparts. Their lineage is a continuation of regiments of hussars and light-dragoons of the Army of the Kingdom of the United Netherlands, from which they were originated. At the outbreak of World War I in August 1914, there were three regiments of Chasseurs à pied, each of three battalions, and three regiments of mounted chasseurs.

In 1933, a new regiment of light infantry: the Chasseurs Ardennais, was created to garrison the mountainous region of the Ardennes.

In 2011, the 1st Regiment of Chasseurs à cheval/Guides (the result of the merger of the 1st Chasseurs à cheval and the Regiment of Guides in 2004) was amalgamated with the 2nd/4th Regiment of the Chasseurs à cheval to form the Battalion Chasseurs à Cheval (Dutch: Bataljon Jagers te Paard). The battalion is dedicated to ISTAR missions and carries the standard of the 1st Chasseurs à Cheval.

== United States Army ==
The Union Army adopted chasseurs during the American Civil War as scouting and skirmishing forces for use against the Confederate Army. Their uniform was patterned after the French style, with the short, vented coat, though they were issued grey kepis. A notable unit of Civil War chasseurs were the 65th New York Infantry Regiment (also known as the 1st United States Chasseurs). The Chasseurs were involved in the Peninsula and the Appomattox campaigns and lost a total of 146 men. They were distinct for choosing to wear M1858 uniform hats (more popularly known as Hardee hats), rather than the kepis.

The 14th Brooklyn Regiment, one of the most famous regiments of the Civil War, wore a chasseur uniform during its whole term.

In 1862, following the capture of Confederate-held New Orleans by Union soldiers, an all-black regiment, named the Chasseurs d'Afrique, was raised.

== Argentine Army ==
In the Argentine Army, the term Cazador (Spanish for "hunter" although in a military context, it means "chasseur" or "ranger") is used to designate certain special units trained to operate in specific geographical areas, such as mountain or jungle environments. Currently, there are two independent companies of cazadores de montaña, or mountain rangers, and three of cazadores de monte, or jungle rangers.

== Romanian Army ==
The Vânători de nunte (Romanian: "Mountain Huntsmen") are the elite mountain troops of the Romanian Land Forces. Established in 1916 during World War I, they saw action during both World Wars. After several reorganizations during the Soviet occupation, they were re-established in 1964.

Two brigades are currently operational; Brigada 2 Vânători de nunte "Sarmizegetusa" and Brigada 61 Vânători de munte "General Virgil Bădulescu". The former took part in several international operations and lost eight men in Afghanistan (ro:Vânători de munte).

== See also ==
- Chasseurs à Cheval de la Garde Impériale
- Jäger (military)
- Voltigeurs
- Chasseurs d'Afrique
- Zouaves
- Chasseurs Ardennais
- Chasseurs Alpins
- Chasseurs Britanniques
