= Siege of Mainz (1792) =

1792 siege during the War of the First Coalition

- Part of the War of the First Coalition
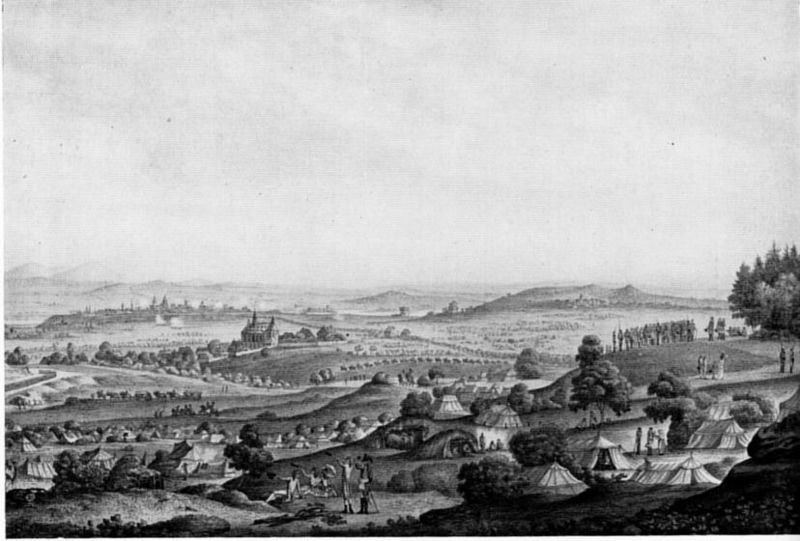
- The siege of Mainz, by Georg Melchior Kraus.
| Date | 18–21 October 1792 |
| Location | Mainz, Electorate of Mainz 50.0000°N 8.2667°E |
| Result | French victory |
| Territorial changes | French occupation of Mainz |

Belligerents
| France | Electorate of Mainz |

Commanders and leaders
| (France) Comte de Custine | Franz von Albini |

Units involved
| Army of the Rhine | Volunteers |

Strength
| 13,000 | 5,000 |
- Location within Europe

The siege of Mainz was a short engagement at the beginning of the War of the First Coalition. The victorious French army of Custine seized the town on October 21, 1792, after three days of siege. The French occupied Mainz, and tried to install the Republic of Mainz there.

After the declaration of war by France against the Archduchy of Austria (1792) and the declaration against Mainz on 21 July 1792, Comte de Custine was given command of the Army of the Rhine to replace Nicolas Luckner, and in September occupied the southern Rhineland about the cities of Speyer and Worms. The regiments of the Duke of Nassau left the Fortress of Mainz on October 5.

== Context ==
After the French Revolution of 1789 the Prince Archbishop of Mainz, Friedrich Karl Joseph von Erthal, became a committed opponent who welcomed with open arms all French nobles fleeing the civil unrest. This made Mainz into an epicenter of the counter-revolution in Europe.

After the declaration of war by France to the Austrian Archduke Francis II on April 20, 1792, counter-revolutionaries in Mainz gathered in July promising to defeat the French revolutionaries and carrying out an "infliction of exemplary punishment." But the failed escape attempt of Louis XVI at Varennes led to the arrest and indictment of the king of France. Thus, on Aug. 4, 1792, the Archbishop of Mainz joined the Austro-Prussian coalition.

However, not only did the attempted invasion of France by the armies of the coalition fail on September 20 at the Battle of Valmy, but the Revolutionary Army proceeded on the offensive and crossed the Rhine, with the aim to take Mainz.

== Progress ==
On 29 and 30 September 1792 the revolutionary armies under General Custine (replacing Nicolas Luckner as the head the Army of the Rhine), seized the city of Speyer. As the French could not hold this position for long, they fell back four days later to Worms. In Mainz, there was panic: the regiments of the Duke of Nassau evacuated the fortress on October 5. The gentry, the bishops, the aristocrats and their servants quickly left the city. It is estimated that between a quarter and a third of the 25,000 inhabitants fled. The rest of the population declared themselves ready to defend the damaged fortifications. They had 5,000 volunteers, which was clearly insufficient to cover the huge enclosures of the city.

The French troops, now called "Army of the Vosges" by decision of the convention, began the encirclement and siege of the city on October 18. On the night of October 18, the vanguard of General Jean Nicolas Houchard reached Weisenau.

"On the 19th, the army corps arrived in sight of Mainz and surrounded the place; our right was based in the village of Hechtsheim, on our left the Rhine; we occupied Bretzenheim, Zahlbach, the mill and the heights of Gonsenheim and head of Mombach woods; headquarters was established at Marienborn. One of our columns from this village Zahlbach, marched to within cannon shot of the town; the troops of Mainz, who lined the advanced works, fired and wounded few men. This operation complete, the howitzer batteries opened fire on the fort Hauptstein and the body of the place; but they were only field guns, and as the fortifications that surround the main forum for Mainz are very extensive, we quickly recognized the impossibility to wear down the city using six inch shells. The engineer commander Clémencey proposed to use red balls; Custine but laughed and said he would have the city without resorting to fire."

The rumor about the 13,000 besiegers spread. The war council chaired by Count Gymnich was terrified. Gymnich convened a civilian and military council to which was called the Baron of Stein, the Prussian Minister, Baron Fechenbach, canon of the cathedral chapter, Baron Franz Joseph von Albini, chancellor of the court, and M. de Kalckhoff, private adviser to the Prince Archbishop. These three dignitaries of the ecclesiastical court argued that it was necessary to defend Mainz, but the governor, the Prussian Minister and members of the Electoral body opened a contrary opinion, and in a final conference where the leaders of the military body were summoned, the council decided to surrender. The board decided to capitulate without a fight on Oct. 20. On the 21st the French entered the residential city of the Electoral, despite its elaborate fortifications that were supposed to protect the city.

After the assault this day was a milestone in future relations between France and the Holy Roman Empire. 20,000 soldiers occupied the city, more than the original population. The occupiers tried to convince people of the benefits of the Revolution. However, revolutionary ideas were not of immediate concern to the public, but the daily problems of supplying so great an occupation force. In addition, General Custine, who was housed at the Castle of the Prince Electors, provided all kinds of instructions for the protection of the university and the premises of the arch-bishop. Thus, many citizens of Mainz regarded the French not as invaders, but as liberators. Franz Konrad Macke served as mayor from February to July 1793.

Here's what one of the Germans said, who liked the arrival of the French:

"Finally, our people began to reject their chains and gain human dignity. Soon we will be free. A few days before the French attacked our city, I already felt a great joy. Freedom and equality finally won in Mainz! The French finally arrived to remove our despots, and the first of them was our prince-bishop, who had fled a few days earlier. I confess that I am delighted at the sight of the immense despair that gripped our noble lords. They were panicked at the approach of the French and piled everything they could carry and fled the city."

— Johan Alois BECKER, letter to my best friend, November 29, 1792, Archives of Mainz (Germany), Series 1512.

== Bibliography ==
- Arthur Chuquet: L'Expédition de Custine (1892), ISBN 978-1113792563. (in French)
- Arthur Chuquet: Mayence (1792-1793) (L. Cerf, 1892), ISBN 978-1142301620. (in French)
- Mainz - Die Geschichte der Stadt - Mayence - Histoire de la ville; Editors: Franz Dumont, Ferdinand Scherf, Friedrich Schütz; 1. Aufl.; Edited by Philipp von Zabern, Mainz 1998, ISBN 978-3805320009. (in German)
- Smith, D. The Greenhill Napoleonic Wars Data Book. Greenhill Books, 1998, ISBN 978-1853672767.

| Preceded by Column of the Goddess | French Revolution: Revolutionary campaigns Siege of Mainz (1792) | Succeeded by Battle of Jemappes |
