= Franz von Albini =

German judge and statesman

Franz Joseph Martin von Albini
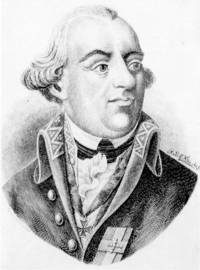
- Franz Joseph Martin

Electoral Chancellor and Minister of the Electorate of Würzburg
- In office 1790–1794

Feldzeugmeister in the Austrian Army
- In office 1799–1806

Governor of Regensburg
- In office 1806–1806

Commissioner of Frankfurt
- In office 19 September 1806 – 25 September 1806

Chairman of the Council of Ministers of Frankfurt
- In office 10 October 1806 – December 1810

Minister of the Grand Duchy of Frankfurt
- In office 1810–1813

Presidential Envoy to the Federal Parliament of the German Confederation
- In office 5 October 1815 – 16 December 1815

Personal details
- Born: 14 May 1748 Sankt Goar, Germany
- Died: 8 January 1816 (aged 67) Dieburg, Germany
- Occupation: Judge, Statesman

Franz Joseph Martin, Freiherr von Albini auf Dürrenried (14 May 1748 – 8 January 1816) was a German judge and statesman, noted for organising the defence of German states against the French Revolution.

== Life ==
Born 1748 in St. Goar, Germany, he served in the Würzburg Court and Government from 1770, the Court of Appeal in Wetzlar from 1775, and became a clerk to the Holy Roman Empire in Vienna 1787. In 1790 he became Electoral Chancellor and Minister, and headed the last Imperial election in 1792. When the armies of Revolutionary France began making incursions into Germany in 1794 he represented the general arming of the people against the French occupation. He organised the defensive Landsturm (Militia) of Mainz and surroundings. Albini was a representative at the Congress of Rastatt 1797. On the re-opening of hostilities in 1799 he was given the rank of Feldzeugmeister in the Austrian Army and appointed to command a 20,000-man corps of German volunteers raised on the right bank of the Rhine under Graf Sztaray. In this capacity he attacked the French under Louis Baraguey d'Hilliers in September and re-captured Frankfurt-am-Main, before threatening the French garrison of Mainz. During Claude Lecourbe's offensive of 16 November he again threatened the French left wing on the right bank of the Neckar.

In 1806 he was made Governor of Regensburg, and for a short period Commissioner of Frankfurt 19–25 September 1806. Then he was Chairman of the Council of Ministers of Frankfurt 10 October 1806 – December 1810. In the Confederation of the Rhine he was made Minister of the Grand Duchy of Frankfurt 1810. Albini was a member of the Conference of Ministers administrating Frankfurt 30 September – 23 December 1813, then Presidential Envoy to the Federal Parliament of the German Confederation in Frankfurt 5 October – 16 December 1815. He died in 1816 in Dieburg.
