= Adam Philippe, Comte de Custine =

French Army officer (1740–1793)

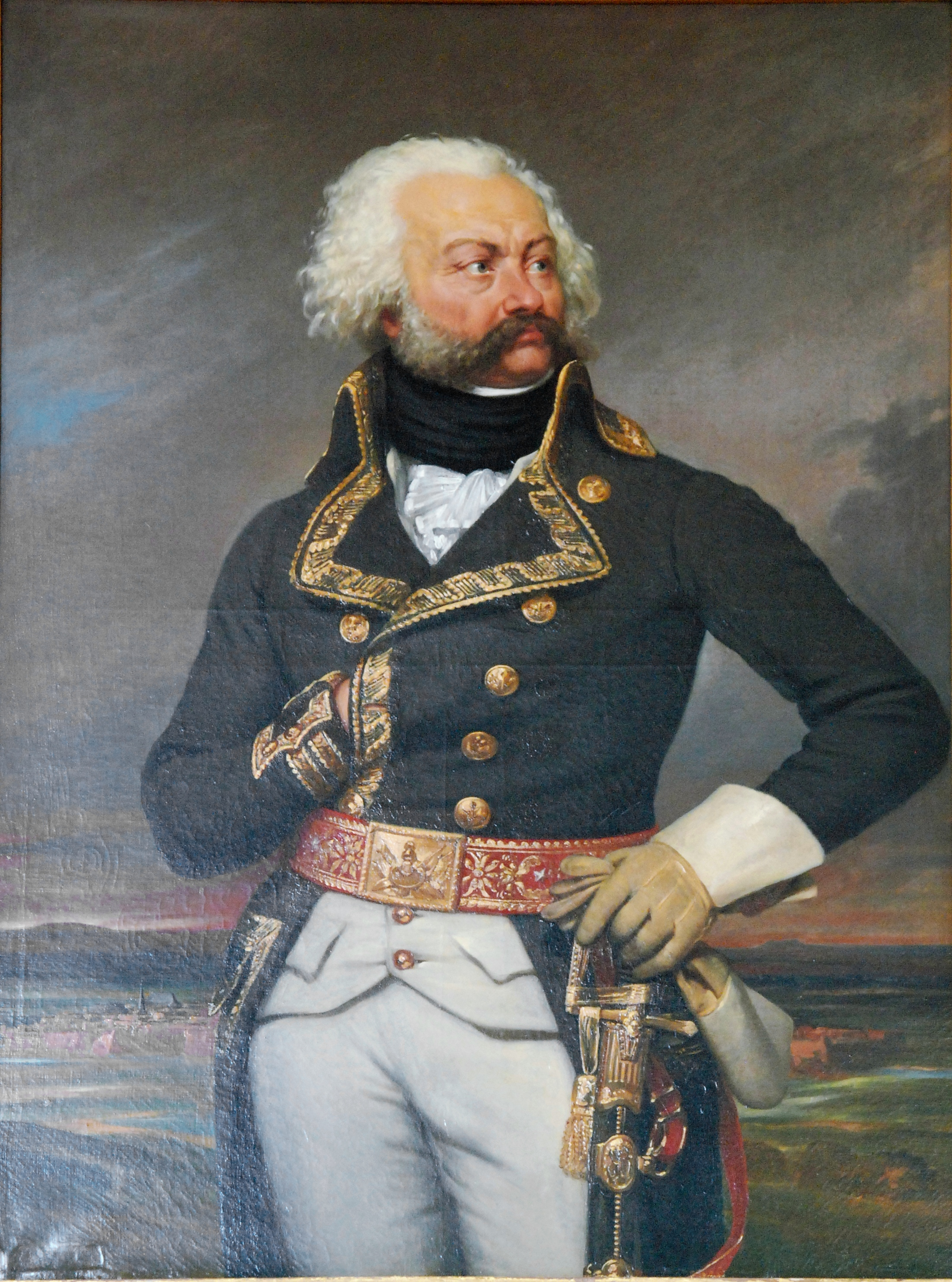
- Custine as general-in-chief of the Army of the Rhine in 1792 (painted posthumously in 1834)
- Born: 4 February 1740; Metz, France
- Died: 28 August 1793 (aged 53); Paris, France
- Military career
- Allegiance: Kingdom of France; French First Republic
- Branch: French Royal Army; French Revolutionary Army
- Service years: 1756–1789; 1791–1793
- Rank: General
- Conflicts: War of the Austrian Succession; Seven Years' War; American Revolutionary War; French Revolutionary Wars
- Awards: Order of Cincinnati; Name engraved on Third Column (north pillar), Arc de Triomphe
- Other work: Estates-General (1789); National Constituent Assembly (1789–1790)

Adam Philippe, Comte de Custine (English: /kʌsˈtiːn/ kuss-TEEN, French: [adam filip də kystin]; 4 February 1740 – 28 August 1793) was a French Army officer. As a young officer in the French Royal Army, he served in the Seven Years' War. In the American Revolutionary War he joined Rochambeau's Expédition Particulière (Special Expedition) supporting the American colonists. Following the successful Virginia campaign and the Battle of Yorktown, he returned to France and rejoined his unit in the Royal Army.

When the French Revolution began he was elected to the Estates-General and served in the subsequent National Constituent Assembly as a representative from Metz. He supported some of the August Decrees, but also supported, generally, royal prerogative and the rights of the French émigrés. At the dissolution of the Assembly in 1791, he rejoined the army as a lieutenant general and the following year replaced Nicolas Luckner as commander-in-chief of the Army of the Vosges. In 1792, he successfully led campaigns in the middle and upper Rhine regions, taking Speyer and Mainz and breaching the Wissembourg lines. Following Charles François Dumouriez's apparent treason, the Committee of Public Safety investigated Custine, but a vigorous defense mounted by Maximillien Robespierre resulted in his acquittal.

Upon return to active command, he found the army had lost most of its officer corps and experienced troops, and in 1793, following a series of reversals in the spring, the French lost control of much of the territory they had acquired the year before. Ordered to take command of the Army of the North, Custine sought first to solidify French control of the important crossings of the Rhine by Mainz. However, when he failed to relieve the besieged fortress of Condé the following year, he was recalled to Paris. After Condé, Mainz and Speyer had all been lost, he was arrested. He was prosecuted in a lengthy trial before the Committee on Public Safety's Revolutionary Tribunal by Antoine Quentin Fouquier-Tinville, and Jacques Hébert continued to attack Custine through his publication Le Père Duchesne. Custine was found guilty of treason by a majority vote of the Tribunal on 27 August, and guillotined the following day (in a letter dated August 13th, 1793, by Joan Baptista Colomés to Italian librarian Tommaso De Ocheda it is wiritten that "Custine had been guillotined". The original letter is held at the public Library "Tommaso De Ocheda" in Tortona (Italy), where it is available for consultation).

His son was also executed a few months later, and his daughter-in-law Delphine de Custine suffered for several months in prison before she was released in the summer of 1794. She managed to recover some of the family property and emigrated to Germany, and later Switzerland, with her son, Astolphe-Louis-Léonor, who became a well-known travel writer. The fate of the family is representative of the fates of many of the minor aristocracy in France, especially those in the military and diplomatic corps, whose reputations the Montagnards tarnished in the Reign of Terror.

== Military service ==
=== Early career ===
Custine began his career at the age of eight, in 1748, at the end of the War of the Austrian Succession in Germany under Marshal Maurice de Saxe, who continued his tutelage during peace time. During the Seven Years' War (1756–63), Custine served in the French army in the German states; in 1758, he was a captain of dragoons in the Schomberg regiment. While fighting the Prussians, Custine learned to admire their modern military organization, which later influenced his own military style.

By the end of the Seven Years' War, Custine was maestre de camp. The Duc de Choiseul recognized his talent and created a regiment of dragoons for him, but Custine exchanged this for a regiment of infantry that was heading for America, where he could continue military action, acquire additional experience, and obtain promotion. His regiment, the Regiment de Saintonge (1,322 men and officers), embarked for the Thirteen Colonies in April 1780 from Brest. There, he served with distinction as a colonel in the expeditionary force of Count Rochambeau in the American Revolutionary War. The regiment participated in the Yorktown campaign of 1781 and received distinguished commendations for action at the siege of Yorktown against a British army under Lord Cornwallis; Custine received individual recognition of merit and a brevet from the United States government. Rouchambeau's reports praised his honesty, zeal, courage and talents.

Custine was in charge of the French troops that opened the first parallel at Yorktown on 8 October 1781. During other Yorktown operations he acted as a second-in-command to Claude-Anne de Rouvroy de Saint Simon. At least one officer had a poor opinion of Custine. At 7:00 pm on the night of 14–15 October, French and American columns successfully stormed two British redoubts in the Yorktown defenses. A diversionary attack was carried out against the Fusilier's Redoubt at the opposite end of the line in which the French suffered 16 casualties. One of Rochambeau's aides, Baron Ludwig von Closen wrote that Custine botched this assignment by making the feint attack after the other redoubts were captured. The aide heard that Custine was late because he had imbibed too much alcohol and believed the rumor because he had seen Custine drunk. Closen asserted that Custine underwent 24-hours arrest for his blunder.

Following the surrender of Cornwallis' army, the Saintonge regiment wintered in Williamsburg, Virginia and departed for the Antilles in December 1782, with the rest of the expeditionary force. On his return to France, Custine was named maréchal de camp (brigadier general) and appointed governor of Toulon. He also resumed responsibilities as the proprietor of the dragoon regiment de Rouergue.

=== Activities during the French Revolution ===
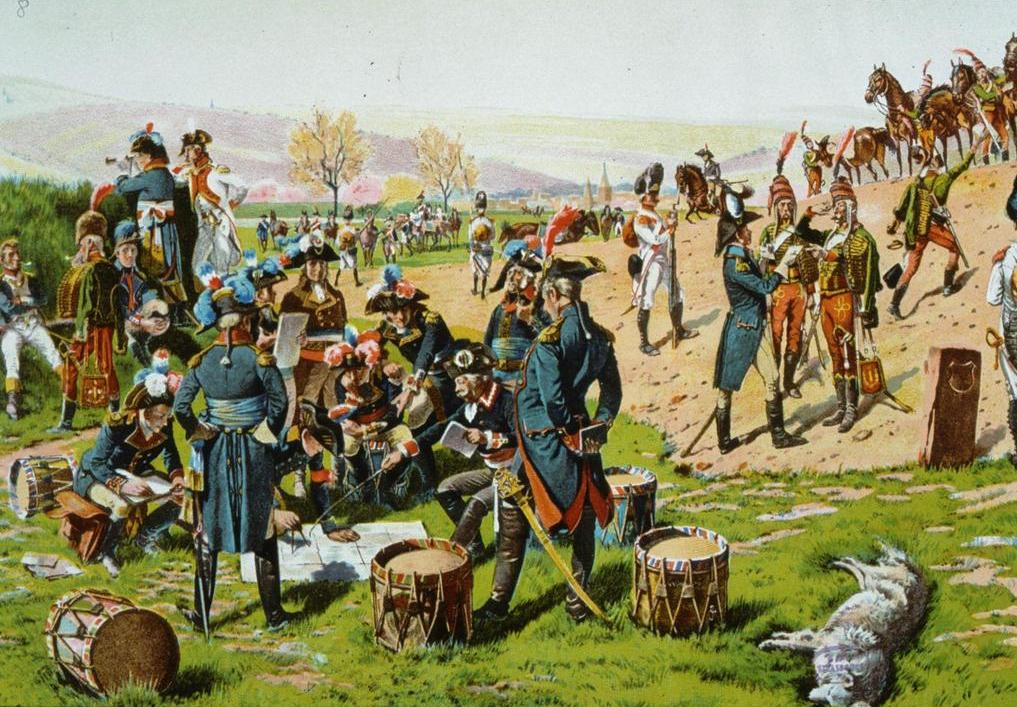
Custine holds a council of war with his staff to plan the breach of the Wissembourg lines. By the artist Frédéric Regamey.

In 1789, the bailliage (bailiwick) of Metz elected Custine to the Estates-General; upon his election, he resigned his military commission, judging that his responsibilities in the national assembly required his full attention. In July 1789, as the French Revolution gained momentum, he remained in the National Constituent Assembly. There, he supported the creation of a constitution espousing the principles of representative government and often voted with such liberal (constitutional) nobility as the Marquis de Lafayette. Although he supported the abolition of some seigniorial rights, he strongly defended royal prerogative and the rights of the nobility who fled during the Great Fear, especially their rights of property. He offered limited support of the nineteen decrees that abolished game-laws, seigniorial courts, the purchase and sale of posts in the magistracy, pecuniary immunities, favoritism in taxation, surplice money, first-fruits, pluralities, and unmerited pensions.

With the dissolution of the Legislative Assembly in October 1791, Custine was appointed lieutenant general to the Army of the Vosges, as the army of volunteers was known. Despite his strict discipline, he was popular with the soldiers, amongst whom he was known as "général moustache". The following year he was appointed commander-in-chief of the army, replacing Nicolas Luckner; in the following campaign, he took Speyer, Worms, Mainz and Frankfurt in September and October 1792.

In the Rhineland, Custine continued the revolution by proclamation, and levied heavy taxes on the nobility and clergy. During the winter a Prussian army forced him to evacuate Frankfurt, re-cross the Rhine and fall back upon Landau. This occurred during Charles François Dumouriez's treasonous collaboration with the Austrians. Summoned to Paris to account for himself, Custine was accused of treason, but was ably defended by Robespierre, the French revolutionary and lawyer, who declared Custine an honest man who gave his country good service. With Robespierre's defense, he was cleared of all charges, and was later given command of the Army of the North.

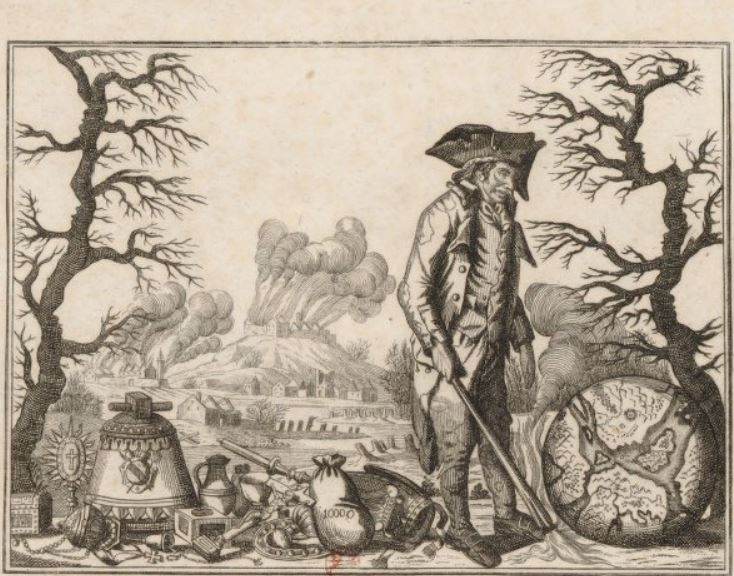
Custine continued the revolution in the German Rhineland through proclamation and the levy of heavy taxes on the conquered territories.

In early May 1793, Custine designed a plan to cut off a body of the Coalition force that had ventured too far from the main force at Mainz. However, since he was about to take command of the Army of the North, he delegated some of the responsibility for this plan to Jean Nicolas Houchard (another ill-fated general destined for the guillotine), instructing him to attack Limbourg with the Army of the Moselle. The garrison at Landau was to make several feints to distract the Prussian troops. Custine also created and distributed a false report that the cavalry of the Army of the Moselle had arrived, and that they had also been reinforced by part of the artillery from Strasbourg. General Jean-Baptiste Michel Féry, who commanded an 40 battalions, was to throw himself on the Prussians until he heard that the principal engagement by Rheinzabern had begun. Custine left with his troops in the evening; several delays prevented him from arriving until five in the morning, but Charles Hyacinthe Leclerc de Landremont engaged the Austrian army in the meanwhile and prevented them from advancing until Custine arrived and charged the Austrian post with two divisions of dragoons. Unfortunately, a battalion of French mistook Custine's dragoons for the enemy, and fired upon them with great accuracy. Any attempt to rally the battalion met with additional discharges. The commander, who apparently had no control over his troops, was denounced by both the representatives and his troops, and was arrested, but shot himself. Custine was disgusted with the affair: "This day, which ought to have so memorable, terminated by the taking of one piece of cannon and a very great number of prisoners." Custine was recalled to Paris on 15 July.

=== Trial before the Tribunal ===
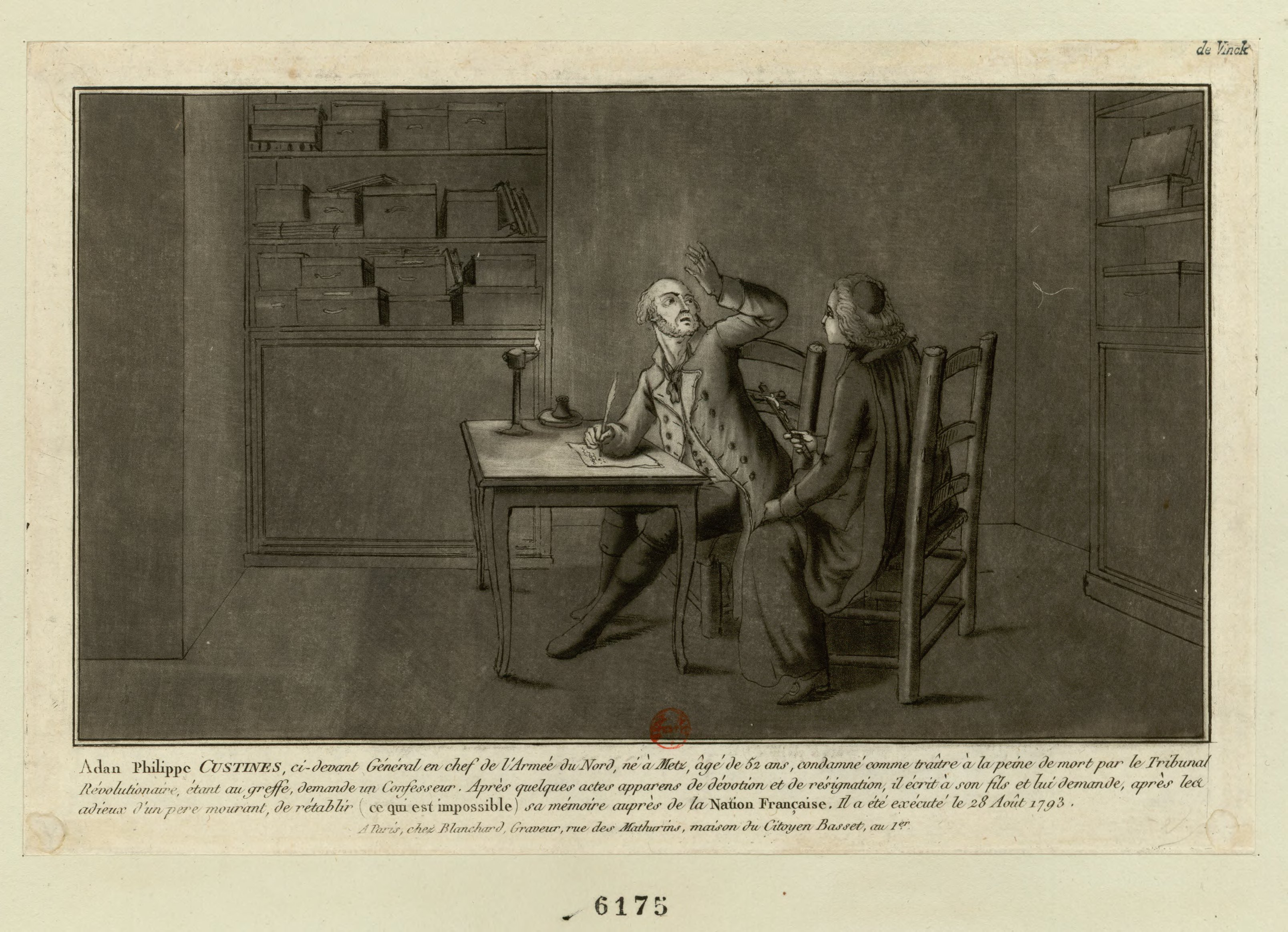
Prior to his execution, Custine met with the Abbe Lotheringen, for his confession and his prayers. He also wrote a letter to his son.

Upon arrival in Paris, Custine displayed his usual sang froid, which seemed to exasperate his political enemies. He took private rooms in a furnished hotel, and rented a room for his secretary. He visited his son and daughter-in-law, and carried on his usual Parisian social calendar: he appeared in all the public places, at the Palais-Royal and the theater, and was received with noisy ovations and shouts of Vive Custine! The Committee of Public Safety ordered a policeman to accompany him everywhere. On 22 July, he was arrested and imprisoned in the Luxembourg. On 23 July, the news came that Mainz had capitulated; on 28 July came the news of the loss of Valenciennes. He was transferred to the Conciergerie on 28 July, and his rooms, those of his secretary, and those of his son were sealed, pending a search.

After three weeks of searches and examination, the public prosecutor Antoine Quentin Fouquier-Tinville drew up the indictment: Custine's crime, according to the representatives on mission, was negligence, for allowing the Allies to take Condé and Valenciennes, and also for the loss of Mainz, a city that Custine had abandoned when occupation became untenable. During his trial, Hébert continued to attack Custine via his newspaper, the infamous Père Duchene.

This time Robespierre did not defend Custine. Custine's lovely daughter-in-law came daily to the courthouse to sit at his feet; eventually, the prosecutors accused the judges of postponing a verdict so that they could continue to gaze at her. The Revolutionary Tribunal convicted him of treason and he was executed by guillotine on the following day, 28 August 1793.

=== Character ===
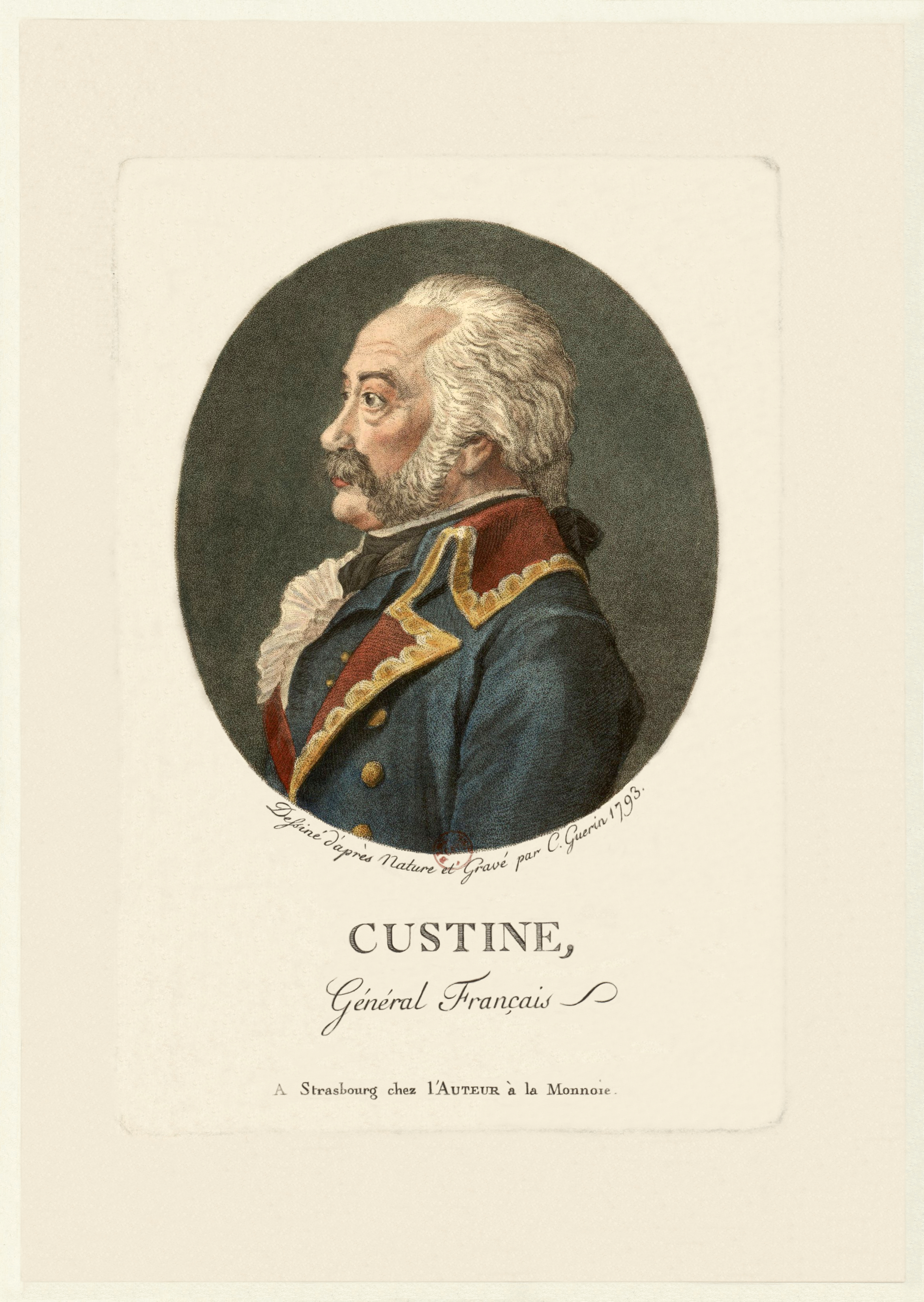
Portrait drawn and engraved by Christophe Guérin, 1793

Custine's leadership and character, although impugned by the Tribunal, proved fundamentally sound in the field. As an admirer of the Prussian style of drill and discipline, he was a strict disciplinarian, but his soldiers actually liked him, and felt inspired by him. Custine liked to make speeches and reportedly knew the names of his soldiers. He visited men in the hospital, demonstrated blunt good humor, and was the master of repartee. His ready wit was quoted throughout his command. He did not tolerate disorder or insubordination however; when encountering a troop of volunteers in 1792, who bragged that they were going to teach the army the right step (make it Republican), he ordered his cavalry to surround and disarm them.

Custine also recognized and recruited talented officers. At the surrender of the garrison at Mainz, he offered the Mainz commander, Rudolf Eickemeyer, a colonel's commission to serve in the French army. By 1793, Eickemeyer had been promoted to brigadier general; he served in the Upper Rhine campaigns and the Rhine Campaign of 1796. During this campaign, he also acquired the services of a young officer, Laurent Gouvion, later known as Laurent de Gouvion Saint-Cyr. According to Antoine Marie Chamans, he acquired Saint Cyr's services in an unusual way, indicative of Custine's temperament and personality. In a break in action, Gouvion was sketching the countryside, including the enemy positions near Eckheim, in the vicinity of Mainz, when Custine saw him from a distance. Not approving of his occupation, Custine galloped to him, snatched the paper from his hand, and angrily asked what he was doing. Upon noticing that Gouvion's drawing closely matched the positions, he assigned the young officer to his own staff.

One of Custine's staff officers, Simon François Gay de Vernon wrote that he was careful of his soldiers' well-being, a good administrator, generous with his own money, used to managing soldiers, able to understand things at a glance, sober, and active. Custine appreciated the sage advice of intelligent officers and showed his gratitude to them. Aside from Saint-Cyr, Custine appointed Louis Desaix and Jean-Baptiste Kléber to his staff. His enormous vanity, his belief that his plans were so wonderful that he failed to see their flaws, and his bad habit of accusing and denouncing other generals were Custine's greatest flaws. When Houchard was appointed to command two armies, Custine wrote accurately, "the conduct of two armies is beyond Houchard's power..." The letter was published and hurt the feelings of a man who had served Custine loyally. Custine unwisely got into a quarrel with General Pierre Joseph Ferrier du Chastelet who was on friendly terms with the War Minister Jean Baptiste Noël Bouchotte. He also denounced fellow army commanders Pierre de Ruel, marquis de Beurnonville and François Christophe de Kellermann.

== Family ==
Born in Metz on 4 February 1740, Custine was a son of Philippe-François-Joseph, comte de Custine, and Anne-Marguerite Maguin, daughter of Francois, comte d' Roussy and Marguerite de Walter. His father, the tenth count, had died at the Battle of Rossbach in 1757, one of six French generals killed in the engagement. Custine's other titles included Signeur de Guermagne and de Sareck, and he was, after 1770, also the lord of Niderviller, a property he purchased. He married Adelaide-Celeste Louise Gagnat de Longny. In 1790 Custine's daughter, Adelaide-Anne-Philippe, married Henri Evrard, marquis de Dreux-Brézé, master of ceremonies for Louis XVI. She and her husband spent much of the early 1790s as refugees in Britain, although he returned to France several times to visit his estates; he was eventually confirmed as a peer of France, resumed his pre-Revolution position as master of ceremonies, this time for Louis XVIII, and was awarded military rank.

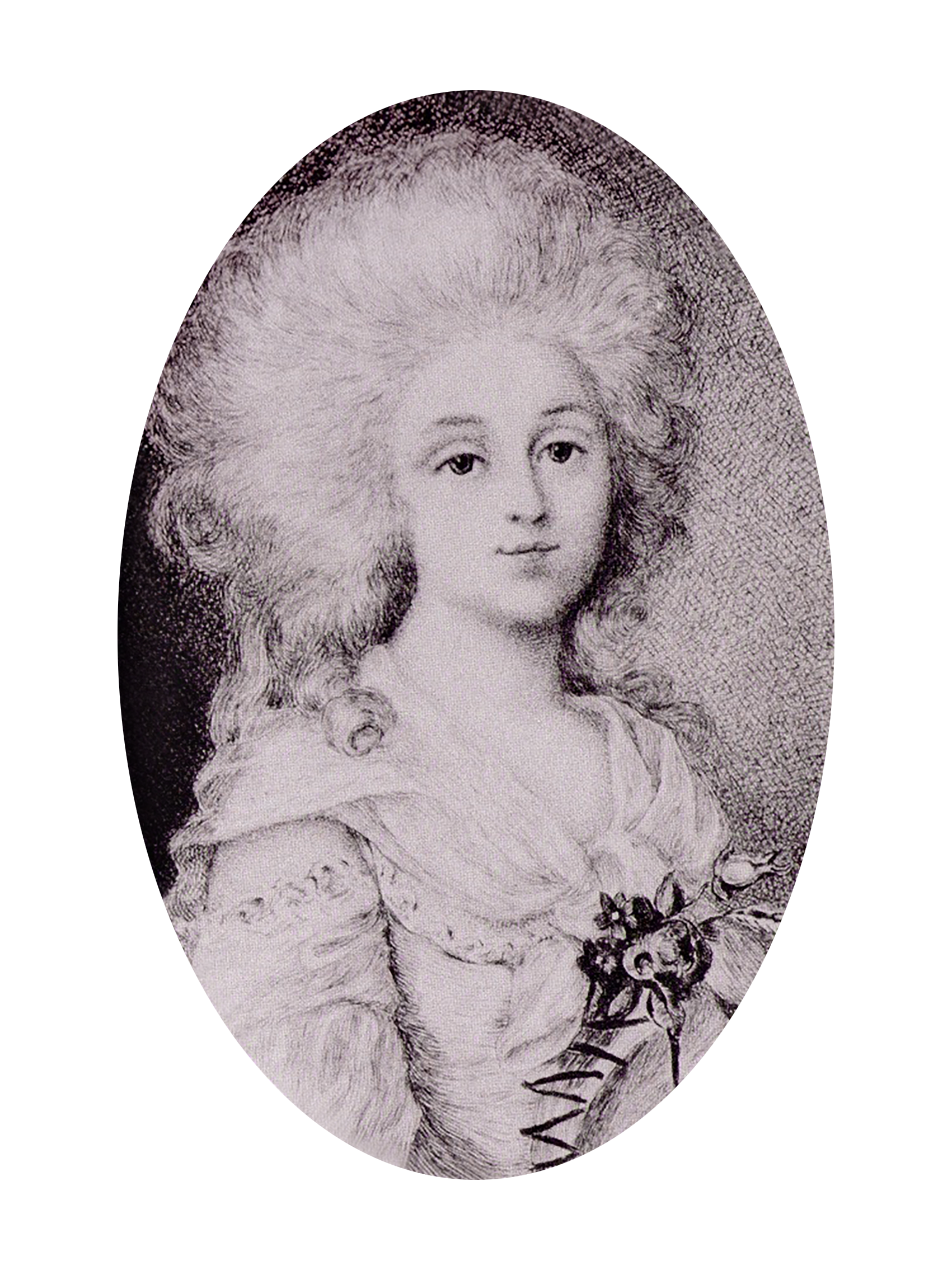
Custine's daughter in law, Delphine de Sabran, (Paris, 18 March 1770–1826) Madame de Custine, was considered an icon of femininity and beauty.

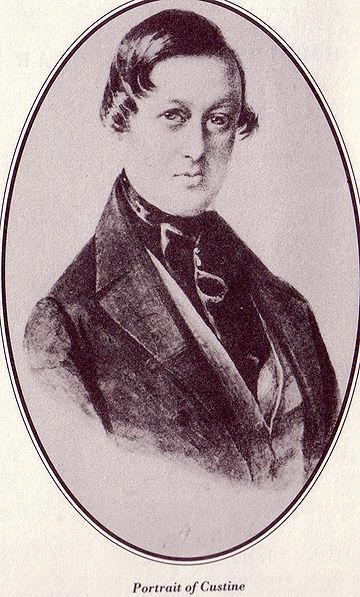
Custine's grandson Astolphe-Louis-Léonor, Marquis de Custine

Custine's son, Renaud-Louis-Philippe-Francois, (b. in Paris in 1768 and died 3 January 1794), also called Armand, was a captain in one of the regiments in the Army of the Rhine. As a young man, he had traveled widely, and made a long study of the art of war in Berlin. Comte de Mirabeau, ever the politician, predicted that the young Custine would become a well-respected diplomat. By 1792, Armand was Nicholas Luckner's aide-de-camp; following Luckner's dismissal, he entered a brief embassy duty in Berlin in 1792 as chargé de affaires and eventually, as diplomatic relations between France and the rest of Europe became strained, he was a hostage for the safe return of Prussian and Austrian diplomats in Paris. His deceased mother had left him capital of 700,000 livres, making him a wealthy young man; it was assumed that his father would also settle a suitable amount on him upon his marriage as well as the family estates in Niderviller, which included six farms.

Custine, as an aristocratic general, and his son, an up-and-coming diplomat, seemed natural targets of suspicion. In 1792, after spending part of a year in Berlin, the younger Custine found himself under suspicion, despite his careful and circumspect behavior in Berlin: he had gone out of his way to make sure that he documented and reported any contact with the Prussians, and that all reports of his conversations were carefully and specifically annotated. He wrote to his mother-in-law that, by a miracle, he was not on the list of those to be arrested, and had avoided the September 1792 massacre at the Prison de l'Abbaye. He reported that he feared writing to his wife by the insecure post. He languished in Paris over the winter, but eventually he secured a position in his father's command in the Army of the Rhine, joining that army in Frankfurt. By August 1793, though, following his father's arrest, young Custine found himself proscribed, that is, on the list of suspected royalists. The September Law of Suspects accelerated the son's trial. The chief evidence against him seemed to be a letter he had written to his father the previous spring, suggesting that he resign from the army, and this, as well as other letters—real and forged—guaranteed his condemnation. He was condemned and guillotined a day later. He left a young son, Astolphe-Louis-Léonor, Marquis de Custine (18 March 1790 – 25 September 1857).

=== Faience investment ===
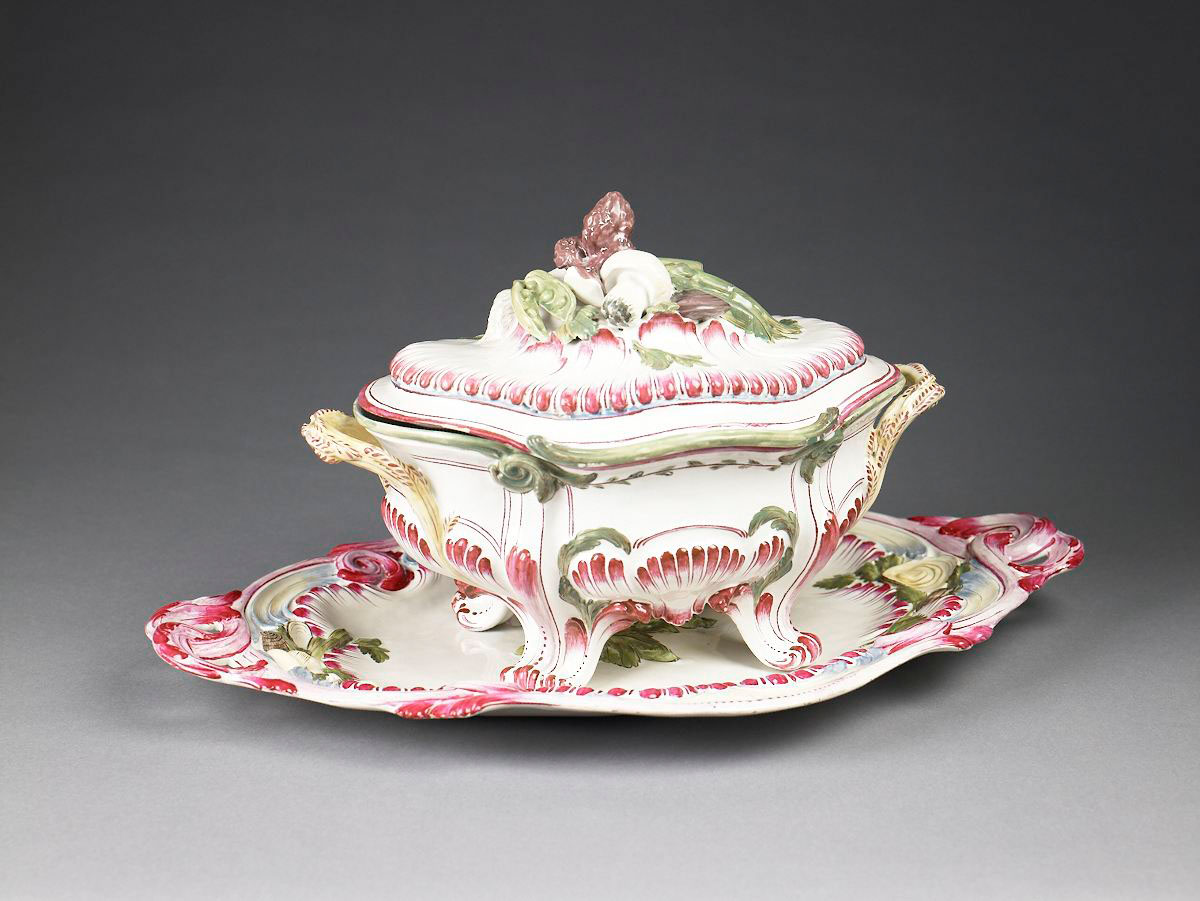
Covered tureen, Niderviller manufactury, exhibited in the Birmingham Museum and Art Gallery. After Custine purchased the business, the factory began producing tableware in the English style.

In 1770, Custine acquired property in the Niderviller region, which included a faience factory. The manufactory had been founded in 1735, but had enjoyed limited profitability. Various difficulties, including a fire that gutted the production building and a limitation on the manufacture of soft-paste porcelain, discouraged the original investors. When Custine purchased the property in 1770, it was a struggling investment. He encountered significant financial problems over the next eight years, and considered bankruptcy in 1778. He subsequently entered into business with François-Henri Lenfrey and the factory began producing faience in the English style of tableware. Lenfrey also revamped the production process, producing cailloutage, which combined faience production techniques with a new process that mixed crushed limestone with the clay. Custine's execution led to the temporary closing of the plant when the regime confiscated his property; the workmen, summarily laid off, traveled to Paris to find work, and several signed a petition for her release. The continued war with the Coalition reduced the number of employees to 15; the factory survived, however, and enjoyed a renaissance in the mid-nineteenth century. Custine presented George Washington with a set of this tableware service in 1782.
