= Siege of Hüningen (1796–1797) =

Part of the War of the First Coalition in the French Revolutionary Wars

- Part of the War of the First Coalition in the French Revolutionary Wars
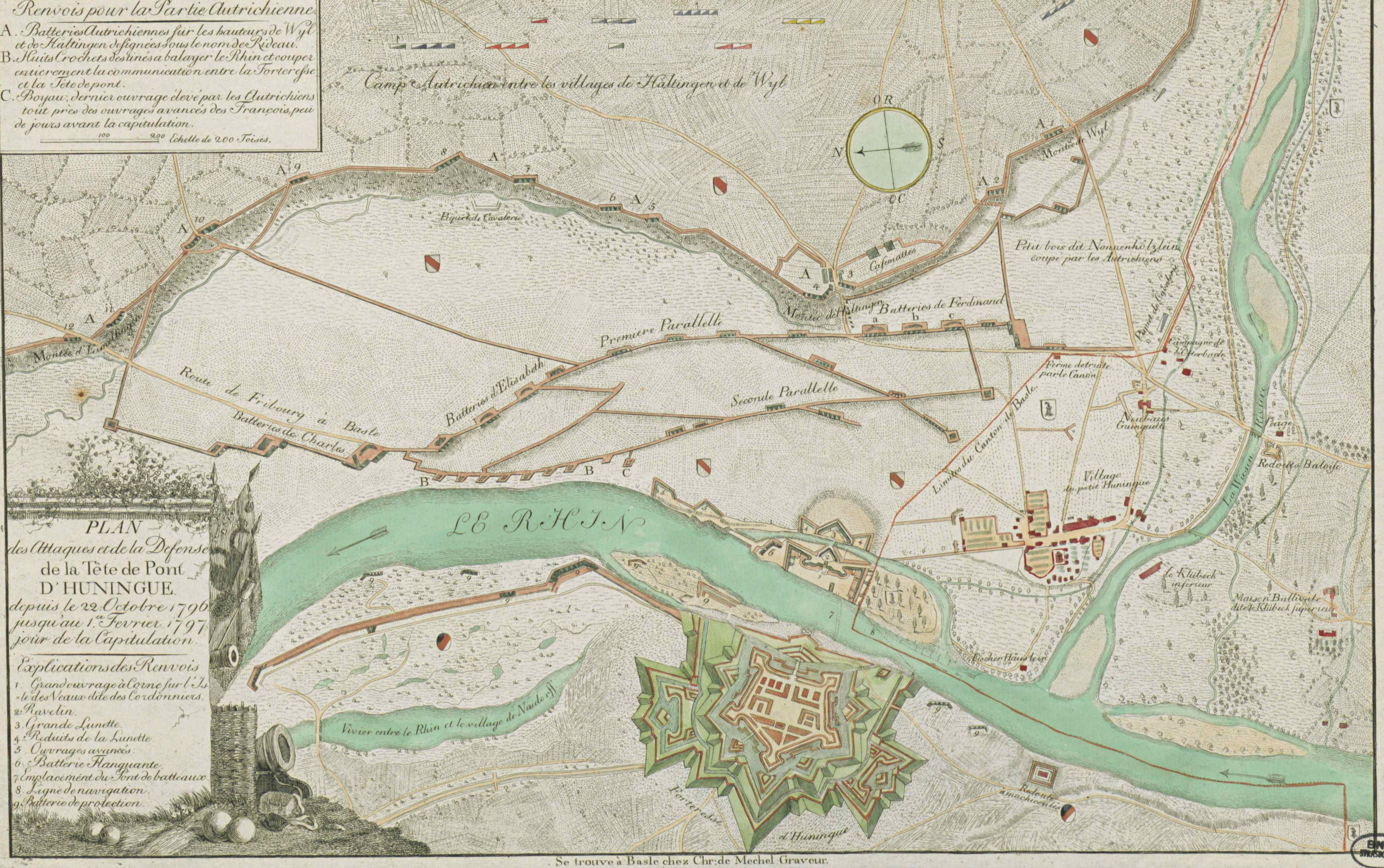
- Vauban fortress at Hünigingen
Date	27 November 1796 – 1 February 1797
Location	Hüningen, (Huningue) Alsace, France
Result	Austrian victory

Belligerents
Republican France	Habsburg Austria

Commanders and leaders
Georges Joseph Dufour; Jean Charles Abbatucci †	Karl Aloys zu Fürstenberg

Strength
4,000	10,000

Casualties and losses
1,200	Not known; light
- Digby Smith. "Siege of Huningen." Napoleonic Wars Data Book. Merchanicsburg, PA: Stackpole, 1998, p. 132.

In the siege of Hüningen (27 November 1796 – 1 February 1797), the Austrians captured the city from the French. Hüningen is in the present-day Department of Haut-Rhin, France. Its fortress lay approximately 2.5 miles (4.0 km) north of the Swiss city of Basel and .5 miles (0.80 km) north of the spot where the present-day borders of Germany, France and Switzerland meet. During the time of this siege, the village was part of the Canton of Basel City and the fortress lay in area contested between the German states and the French First Republic.

The siege occurred within the French Revolutionary Wars during which Revolutionary France ranged itself against a Coalition that included most of the states with which it shared land or water borders. In particular, France was at odds with the European monarchies, who initially feared for the safety of Louis XVI and his wife, who was the sister of the Holy Roman Emperor. Fighting, which began in 1792, had been inconclusive. Fighting in 1795 had largely favored the Coalition; the Campaign in the Rhineland in 1796, though, had pushed the Coalition forces far into the German states; the Coalition forces had pushed back and, at the end of the summer's fighting in 1796, the Austrian force under command of Archduke Charles had succeeded in pushing the French back to the Rhine.

With the conclusion of the Battle of Schliengen on 24 October, the French army withdrew south and west toward the Rhine. Forces commanded by Jean Charles Abbatucci and Pierre Marie Barthélemy Ferino provided the rear guard support and the main force retreated across the Rhine into France. The French retained control of the fortifications at Kehl and Hüningen and, more importantly, the tête-du-ponts (bridgeheads) of the star-shaped fortresses where the bridges crossed the Rhine. The French chief commander, Jean Victor Moreau, offered an armistice to the Austrian commander, which the archduke was inclined to accept. He wanted to secure the Rhine crossings and then send troops to northern Italy to relieve Dagobert Sigmund von Wurmser at besieged Mantua; an armistice with Moreau would allow him to do that. However, his brother, Francis II, the Holy Roman Emperor, and the civilian military advisers of the Aulic Council categorically refused such an armistice, forcing Charles to order simultaneous sieges at Kehl and Hüningen. These tied his army to the Rhine for most of the winter. He himself moved north with the bulk of his force to invest the larger crossing at Kehl, and instructed Karl Aloys zu Fürstenberg to conduct the siege in the south by Basel. While the Austrians besieged these Rhine crossings, Moreau had sufficient surplus troops to send 14 demi-brigades (approximately 12,000 troops) into Italy to assist in the siege at Mantua.

Fürstenberg's force initiated the siege within days of the Austrian victory at the Battle of Schliengen. Most of the siege ran concurrently with the siege at Kehl, which concluded on 9 January 1797. By the time troops engaged at Kehl marched to Hüningen in preparation for a major assault, Fürstenberg had established extensive earthworks, built three large batteries that rained continuous cannonades into the fortress. The Habsburgs repelled a French sortie in early December in which Abbatucci, the French commander, was killed. His replacement, Georges Joseph Dufour, capitulated on 1 February 1797, preventing a costly assault, and the French evacuated, taking everything of value that remained with them. Like the conclusion of the siege at Hüningen, the Austrians took possession of a pile of rubble.

== Background ==
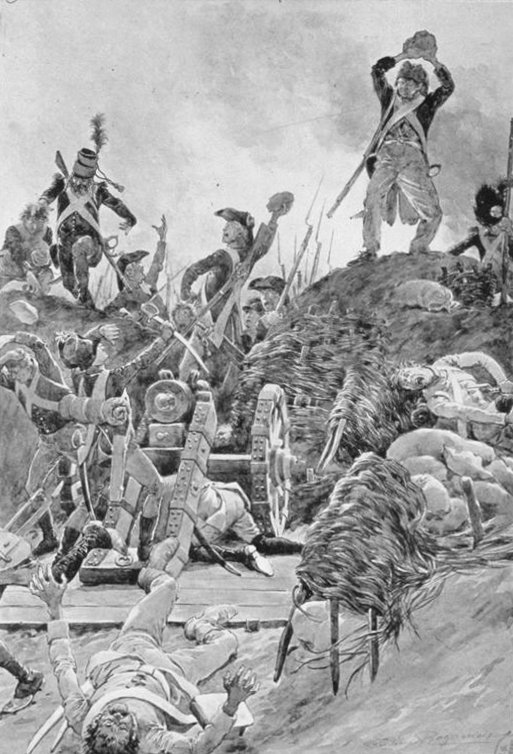
French troops overwhelmed the Swabian militia at Kehl on 24 June 1796

Initially, the rulers of Europe, such as Joseph II, Holy Roman Emperor, viewed the revolution in France as an event between the French king and his subjects, and not something in which they should interfere. The French Republican position became increasingly difficult. Compounding problems in international relations, French émigrés continued to agitate for support of a counter-revolution abroad. Chief among them were the Prince Condé, his son, the Duke de Bourbon, and his grandson, the Duke d'Enghien. From their base in Koblenz, immediately over the French border, they sought direct support for military intervention from the royal houses of Europe, and raised an army.

As the rhetoric grew more strident, however, the other monarchies started to view events with alarm. In 1790, Leopold succeeded his brother Joseph as emperor and by 1791, he considered the situation surrounding his sister, the French Queen Marie Antoinette, and her children, with greater and greater alarm. In August 1791, in consultation with French émigré nobles and Frederick William II of Prussia, he issued the Declaration of Pillnitz, in which they declared the interest of the monarchs of Europe as one with the interests of Louis and his family. They threatened ambiguous, but quite serious, consequences if anything should happen to the royal family.

On 20 April 1792, the French National Convention declared war on Austria. In this War of the First Coalition (1792–1798), France ranged itself against most of the European states sharing land or water borders with her, plus Portugal and the Ottoman Empire. Coalition forces achieved several victories at Verdun, Kaiserslautern, Neerwinden, but these were countered by French victories at Tourcouring (1794), Dunkirk, and Haguenau. For the French, the Rhine Campaign of 1795 proved especially disastrous, although they had achieved some success in other theaters of war (see for example, War of the Pyrenees (1793–1795).

== Complications ==
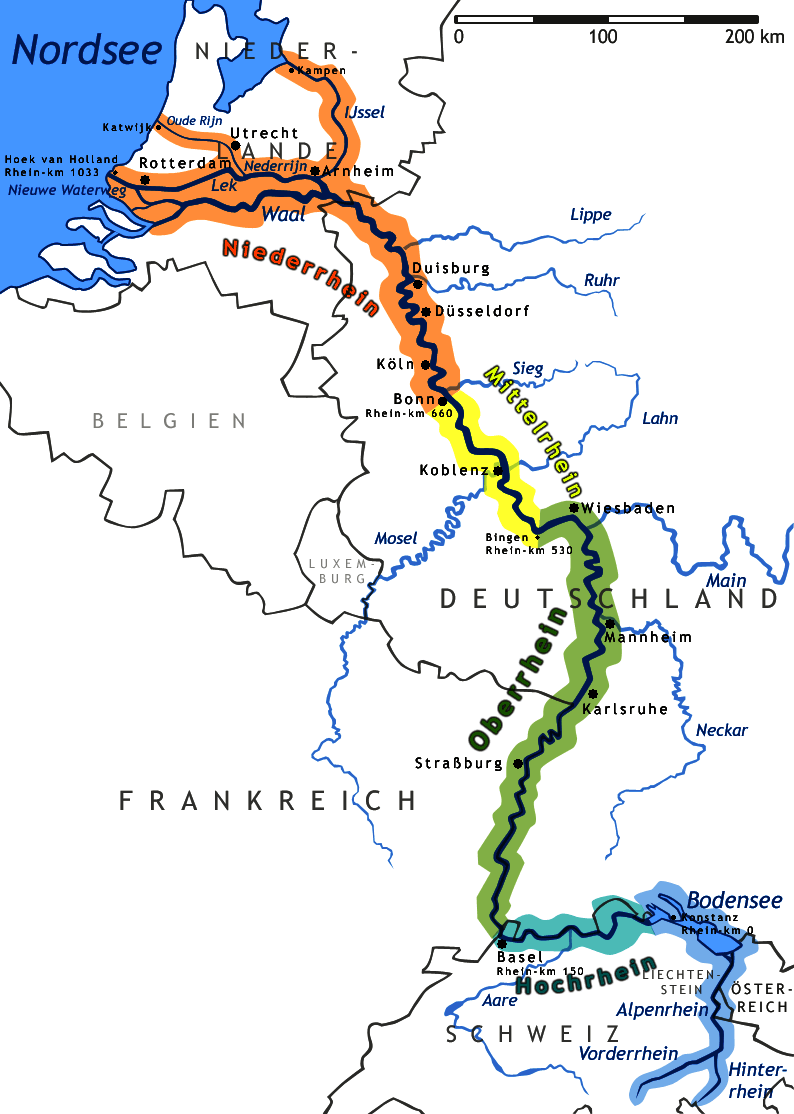
The Rhine River prevented easy escape into France.

=== Geography ===
The Rhine River flows west along most of the border between the former German states and the northern territories and cities of the former Swiss Cantons. (Note: These territories include present-day Baden-Württemberg and the Cantons of Schaffhausen, Aargau, Basel-land, and Basel-Stadt. Schaffhausen and Aargau attained canton status in the peace settlement of 1803, a de facto acceptance of the Swiss Revolution of 1798–99; Basel-land and Basel-Stadt were created from the Canton Basel in 1833.) Along the 80-mile (130 km) stretch between the Rhine Falls (near Schaffhausen) and Basel, the High Rhine (Hochrhein) cuts through steep hillsides over a gravel bed; in some places, such as the former rapids at Laufenburg, it moves in torrents. The terrain flattens a few miles north and east of Basel. The Rhine makes a wide, northerly turn, in what is called the Rhine knee, and enters the Rheingraben (Rhine ditch), part of a rift valley bordered by the Black Forest on the east and Vosges Mountains on the west. Here the river runs between present-day France and the German federal state of Baden-Württemberg.

In 1796, the plain on both sides of the river, some 19 miles (31 km) wide, was dotted with villages and farms. At both far edges of the flood plain, especially on the eastern side, the old mountains created dark shadows on the horizon. Tributaries cut through the hilly terrain of the Black Forest, creating deep defiles in the mountains. The tributaries meandered in rivulets through the flood plain to the river. The river itself looked different in the 1790s than it does in the 21st century; engineers "corrected" (straightened) the passage from Basel to Iffezheim between 1817 and 1875. Between 1927 and 1975, engineers constructed a canal to control the water level. In 1790, though, the river was wild and unpredictable, in some places four or more times wider than in the twenty-first century, even under regular (non-flood stage) conditions. Its channels wound through marsh and meadow, and created islands of trees and vegetation that were periodically submerged during floods. It was crossable at Kehl, by Strasbourg, and Hüningen, by Basel, where systems of viaducts and causeways made access reliable.

=== Political terrain ===
Complications of political boundaries
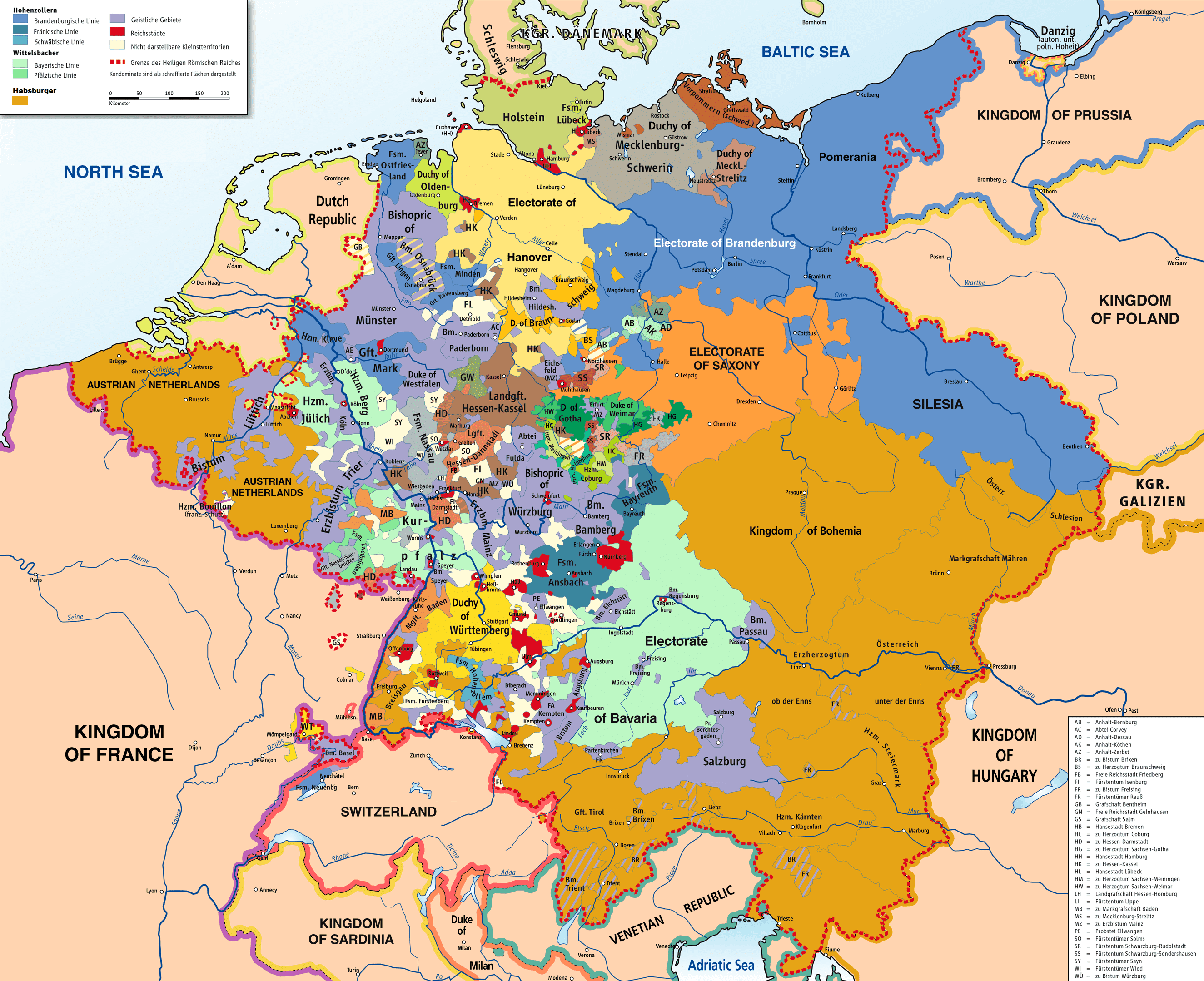
The plethora of states of the Holy Roman Empire was especially dense on the east bank of the Rhine.

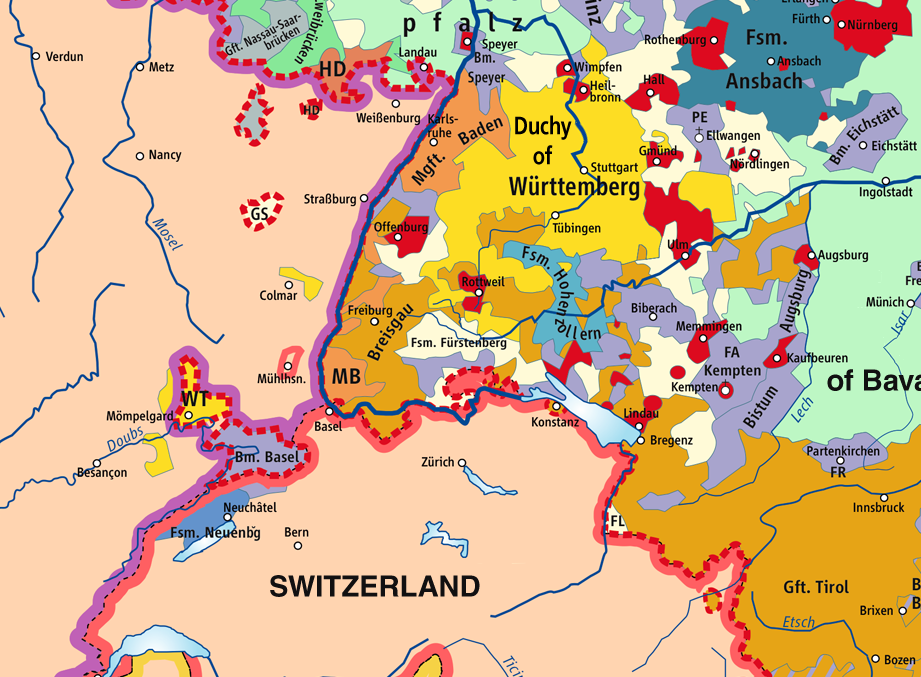
In particular, the states involved in late 1796 included, for example, the Breisgau (Habsburg), Offenburg and Rottweil (imperial cities), the princely states of Fürstenberg, Neuenburg, and Hohenzollern, the Duke of Baden, the Duchy of Württemberg, and several dozen ecclesiastic polities. Many of these territories were not contiguous: a village could belong predominantly to one polity, but have a farmstead, a house, or even one or two strips of land that belonged to another polity. The light cream-colored territories are so subdivided they cannot be named.

The German-speaking states on the east bank of the Rhine were part of the vast complex of territories in central Europe called the Holy Roman Empire. The considerable number of territories in the Empire included more than 1,000 entities. Their size and influence varied, from the Kleinstaaten ("little states") that covered no more than a few square miles, or included several non-contiguous pieces, to the small and complex territories of the princely Hohenlohe family branches, to sizable, well-defined territories such as the Kingdoms of Bavaria and Prussia. Their governance varied: they included free imperial cities, also of different sizes, such as the powerful Augsburg and the minuscule Weil der Stadt; ecclesiastical territories, also of varying sizes and influence, such as the wealthy Abbey of Reichenau and the powerful Archbishopric of Cologne; and dynastic states such as Württemberg. When viewed on a map, the Empire resembled a Flickenteppich ("patchwork carpet"). Both the Habsburg domains and Hohenzollern Prussia also included territories outside the Empire structures, such as the Habsburg territories in eastern Europe and northern Italy. There were also territories completely surrounded by France that belonged to Württemberg, the Count of Solm, the archbishopric of Trier, and Hesse-Darmstadt. Among the German-speaking states, the Holy Roman Empire's administrative and legal mechanisms provided a venue to resolve disputes between peasants and landlords, between jurisdictions, and within jurisdictions. Through the organization of imperial circles (Reichskreise), groups of states consolidated resources and promoted regional and organizational interests, including economic cooperation and military protection.

=== Diplomacy and politics ===
The Vauban fortresses at Hüningen and Kehl were both important bridgeheads across the river; maintaining control of them had been critical in Moreau's relatively easy access to the German side of the Rhine in June 1796. At both towns, the principal fortresses lay on the west side (French side) of the Rhine; the bridgeheads and the smaller fortifications surrounding those lay on the both sides. Taking them would require a costly and time-consuming siege.

Charles had formulated a plan to circumvent that problem, and to free enough of his troops to send a sizable relief fortress into northern Italy, where Wurmser held Mantua against the French. If the French would agree to an armistice, he would take command of the fortresses; the French would withdraw, and he could send a sizable force to northern Italy to help relieve Mantua. The siege of Mantua was long and costly, and had tied up a significant portion of both the French and Austrian force. The French Directory was willing to give up the Mantua in exchange for the Rhine bridgeheads, which they deemed important for the defense of France.

After the retreat from Schliengen, Moreau offered an armistice to Charles in keeping with his own goals. Charles wanted to accept terms of armistice on the Rhine so he could send a large part of his army to attack the French in northern Italy. Instead, his brother and the civilian military advisers of the Council instructed him to lay siege to the fortresses, to take them, and secure any possible access to southern Germany via the Rhine. By tying Charles down at the Rhine, besieging the two strongly-fortified and well-staffed Vauban fortresses across the river, the Aulic Council effectively sealed the fate of Wurmser's troops in Mantua. With the failure of Paul Davidovich's relief column to reach their beleaguered comrades, Wurmser hoped still that Joseph Alvintzy would cross the Adige river to support him. In negotiations with Napoleon, Clarke, from the French Directory, proposed an armistice that would last until June 1797. Bonaparte refused any armistice until Mantua surrendered; the Directory had hopes of retaining Hüningen and Kehl, and would allow Austria to keep Mantua, which Napoleon flatly refused, believing Mantua the keystone to Habsburg Italy. When it became clear that Charles was locked into place at Kehl, and Fürstenburg at Hüningen, Moreau moved 14 demi-brigades (approximately 12,000 troops) to Italy to support Napoleon's assault on Mantua, leaving only a modest force to defend Hüningen.

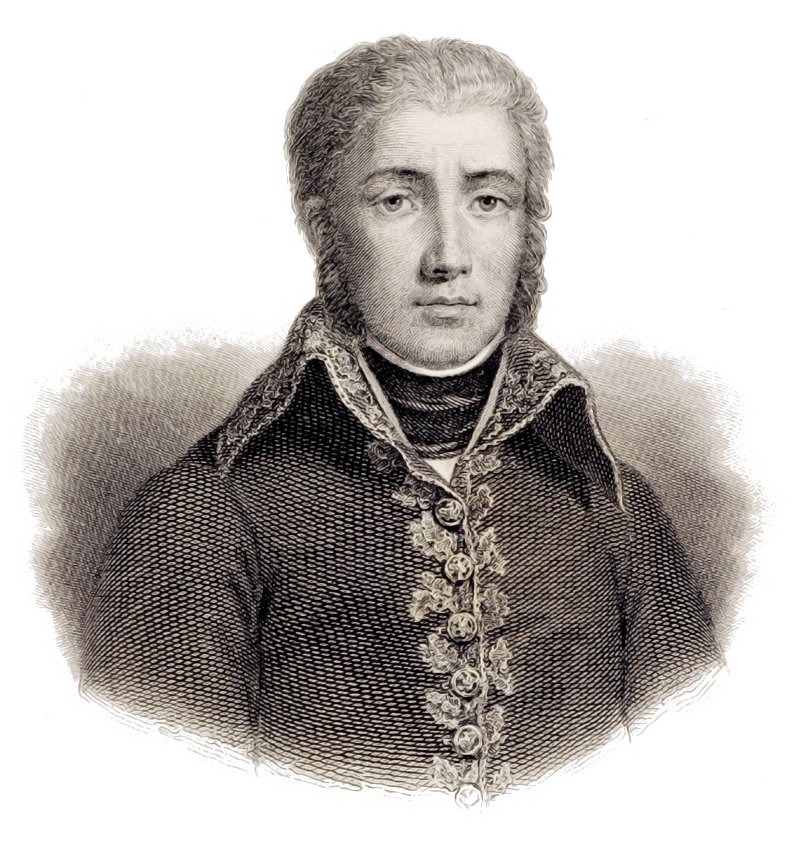
Moreau's skillful retreats from Emmendingen and Schliengen maintained his army intact for withdrawal across the Rhine and defense of the crossings at Kehl and Hüningen.

== Military situation in early 1796 ==
In January 1796, Coalition and Revolutionary leaders called a truce. This agreement lasted until 20 May 1796, when the Austrians announced that it would end on 31 May. The Coalition's Army of the Lower Rhine included 90,000 troops. The 20,000-man right wing under Duke Ferdinand Frederick Augustus of Württemberg stood on the east bank of the Rhine behind the Sieg River, observing the French bridgehead at Düsseldorf. The garrisons of Mainz Fortress and Ehrenbreitstein Fortress counted 10,000 more. Charles posted the remainder of the Habsburg and Coalition force on the west bank behind the Nahe. (Note: The First Coalition included Habsburg Austria, the Holy Roman Empire, Prussia, Spain and the Dutch Republic until 1795, Sardinia until 1796, Sicily and several other Italian states (at various times and duration), French royalists (mostly those in the Prince Conde's emigre army, Newfoundland, and Great Britain.) Dagobert Sigmund von Wurmser led the 80,000-strong Army of the Upper Rhine. Its right wing occupied Kaiserslautern on the west bank while the left wing under Anton Sztáray, Michael von Fröhlich and Louis Joseph, Prince of Condé guarded the Rhine from Mannheim to Switzerland. The original Austrian strategy was to capture Trier and to use their position on the west bank to strike at each of the French armies in turn. However, after news arrived in Vienna of Napoleon Bonaparte's successes, Wurmser was sent to Italy with 25,000 reinforcements. Reconsidering the situation, the Aulic Council gave Archduke Charles command over both Austrian armies and ordered him to hold his ground.

On the French side, the 80,000-man Army of Sambre-et-Meuse held the west bank of the Rhine down to the Nahe and then southwest to Sankt Wendel. On the army's left flank, Jean Baptiste Kléber had 22,000 troops in an entrenched camp at Düsseldorf. The right wing of the Army of Rhin-et-Moselle was positioned behind the Rhine from Hüningen northward, with its center along the Queich River near Landau and its left wing extended west toward Saarbrücken. Pierre Marie Barthélemy Ferino led Moreau's right wing, consisting of three infantry and cavalry divisions under Bourcier and Delaborde. Louis Desaix commanded the center with three divisions led by Beaupuy, Delmas and Xaintrailles. Laurent Gouvion Saint-Cyr directed the left wing with two divisions commanded by Duhesme and Taponier.

The French grand plan called for two French armies to press against the flanks of the northern armies in the German states while a third army simultaneously approached Vienna through Italy. Jean-Baptiste Jourdan's army would push southeast from Düsseldorf, hopefully drawing troops and attention toward themselves, which would allow Moreau's army an easier crossing of the Rhine between Kehl and Hüningen. According to plan, Jourdan's army feinted toward Mannheim, and Charles quickly reapportioned his troops. Moreau's army attacked the bridgehead at Kehl, which was guarded by 7,000 imperial troops—troops recruited that spring from the Swabian Circle polities, inexperienced and untrained—which amazingly held the bridgehead for several hours, but then retreated toward Rastatt. On 23–24 June Moreau reinforced the bridgehead with his forward guard. After pushing the imperial militia from their post on the bridgehead, his troops poured into Baden unhindered. Similarly, in the south, by Basel, Ferino's column moved speedily across the river and proceeded up the Rhine along the Swiss and German shoreline, toward Lake Constance and into the southern end of the Black Forest. Anxious that his supply lines would be overextended, Charles began a retreat to the east.

At this point, the inherent jealousies and competition between the participating generals came into play. Moreau could have joined up with Jourdan's army in the north, but did not; he proceeded eastward, pushing Charles into Bavaria. Jourdan also moved eastward, pushing Wartensleben's autonomous corps into the Ernestine duchies, and neither seemed willing to unite his flank with his compatriot's. Wartensleben also continued to ignore Charles' requests, and later commands, to move his corps to the south and unite with the Habsburg army along the Danube. Instead, he continued to pull further to the north and east. There followed a summer of strategic retreats, flanking, and reflanking maneuvers. On either side, the union of two armies—Wartensleben's with Charles', or Jourdan's with Moreau's—could have crushed the opposition.

=== Preliminaries to the siege ===
Wartensleben and Charles united first, and the tide turned against the French. With 25,000 of his best troops, the Archduke crossed to the north bank of the Danube at Regensburg and moved north to join his colleague Wartensleben. The defeat of Jourdan's army at Amberg, Würzburg and Altenkirchen allowed Charles to move more troops to the south. The next contact occurred on 19 October at Emmendingen, in the Elz valley which winds through the Black Forest. The section of the valley involved in the battle runs southwest through the mountains from Elzach, through Bleibach and Waldkirch. Just to the southwest of Waldkirch, the river emerges from the mountains and flows northwest towards the Rhine, with the Black Forest to its right. This section of the river passes through Emmendingen before it reaches Riegel. Riegel sits in a narrow gap between the Black Forest and an isolated outcropping of volcanic hills known as the Kaiserstuhl. Here the archduke split his force into four columns.

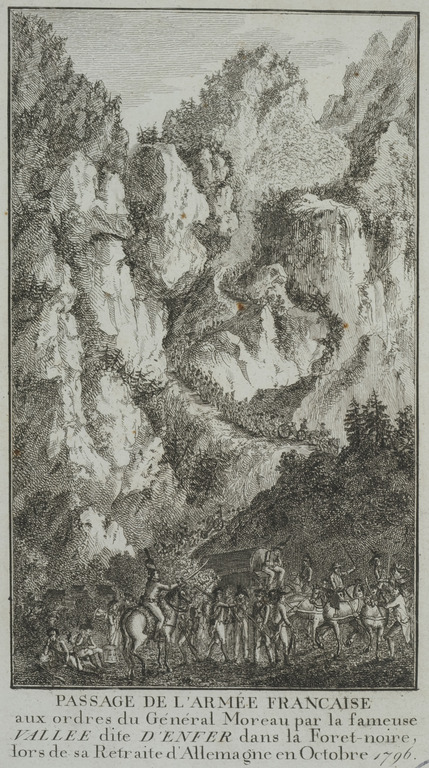
Wet weather and steep and treacherous terrain in the Black Forest made passage difficult for both armies, especially by the volcanic formations near Kaiserstuhl.

Column Nauendorf, in the upper Elz, had eight battalions and 14 squadrons, advancing southwest to Waldkirch; column Wartensleben had 12 battalions and 23 squadrons advancing south to capture the Elz bridge at Emmendingen. Latour, with 6,000 men, was to cross the foothills via Heimbach and Malterdingen, and capture the bridge of Köndringen, between Riegel and Emmendingen, while column Fürstenberg held Kinzingen, about 2 miles (3.2 km) north of Riegel. Frölich and Condé (part of Nauendorf's column) were to pin down Ferino and the French right wing in the Stieg valley. Nauendorf's men were able to ambush Saint' Cyr's advance; Latour's columns attacked Beaupuy at Matterdingen, killing the general and throwing his column into confusion. Wartensleben, in the center, was held up by French riflemen until his third (reserve) detachment arrived to outflank them; the French retreated across the rivers, destroying all the bridges. (Note: Wartensleben was also wounded, and died of his injuries a year later in Vienna.)

Ultimately, this placed Moreau in an indefensible position. Overnight the Austrians repaired one of the main bridges and moved closer to Freiburg. If Moreau withdrew from Freiburg, Ferino's column would be trapped. On 18 September, an Austrian division under Feldmarschall-Leutnant Petrasch had stormed the Rhine bridgehead at Kehl, but had been driven out by a French counterattack. Even though the French still held the crossing at Kehl and Strasbourg, the Petrasch's Austrians prevented French access. Moreau chose to organize a careful retreat toward Basel, planning to cross the river at Hüningen. On 20 October 1796, Jean-Victor Moreau's army of 20,000 united south of Freiburg im Breisgau with Ferino's column. Ferino's force was smaller than Moreau had hoped, bringing the total of the combined French force to about 32,000. His own army had been isolated from the flanking army of Jourdan, which had retreated northward toward Mainz. Moreau organized a careful retreat toward Basel, planning to cross the river, if necessary, at Hüningen. A rear guard protected the withdrawal from Freiburg im Breisgau, and the French retreated through the Rhine valley, with the river on one side, and the Black Forest on the other. The Archduke entered the Breisgau on 21 September, where he was joined by both the Army of Condé, commanded by Louis Joseph, Prince of Conde, and the corps of General Fröhlich. His combined forces of 24,000 closely followed Moreau's rear guard from Freiburg, southwest to a line of hills stretching between Kandern and the river.

The two armies met again at Schliengen on 24 October. Moreau had arrayed his force in a semi-circle on the heights, offering him a tactically superior position. Charles threw his army against both flanks; the French left fought stubbornly, but gave way under the pressure of Condé's emigre corps; the right flank withstood a day-long battering by Latour and Nauendorf, but eventually had to withdraw. The French right reestablished itself further up the mountains, at the heights of Tannenkirch (see 47°43′N 7°37′E), a position scarcely less impregnable than that which it had abandoned, and the bulk of Charles' force stood ready to attack again the next morning. The Austrian army occupied a line which passed obliquely across the extremity of his right, and another line which passed along his left; they both intersected in front of him, where the main force of Charles' army blocked any movement forward. With luck, his troops might hold the Austrians off another day, but there were hazards: principally, the Austrians could break either wing, swing behind him and cut him off from the bridges at Hüningen, which was his only escape route back to France. With a strong rear guard provided by Generals Abbatucci and Lariboisière, he abandoned his position the same night and retreated part of the 9.7 miles (16 km) to Hüningen. The right and left wings followed. By 3 November he had reached Haltingen, where he organized his force to cross over the Hüningen bridges into France.

== Conduct of siege ==
While the siege in Kehl continued, Fürstenberg remained in "observation" at Hüningen, meaning his troops created a surrounding perimeter and initiated construction of earthen works to allow them to assault the fortification later. Probably exceeding his instructions, Fürstenberg offered the commander of the bridgehead, the French general of brigade Jean Charles Abbatucci, the opportunity to surrender, which was declined. Immediately, Fürstenberg's chief engineer opened the fortifications and drained the water-filled moat. In subsequent days, the Austrians expanded ramparts and trenches along the Weyl and to Haltingen. In the night of 30 November – 1 December, Fürstenberg's troops stormed the bridgehead twice, but were twice repulsed. By 20 November, the Austrians had completed construction of the Ferdinand batteries. On the 21–24 of that month, they advanced further, covering the route between Freiburg im Breisgau and Basel, and constructed the batteries of Charles and Elizabeth, which, laying closer to the river, could fire directly into the defenders' redoubts. On the evening of the 24th, the Austrians fired 100 shells and 600 balls into the fortress. On 28 November, Fürstenberg offered General Abbatucci another opportunity to surrender, giving him three hours to consider. Abbatucci responded that any surrender was impossible. In mid-day, a cannonade began that destroyed much of the bridges between the points. This barrage continued for several days, from 28 November until early December. Abbatucci led a sortie in which the French attempted to take one of the batteries from the Austrians. The sortie failed and Abbatucci was wounded in the chest. He died in the evening of 2–3 December.

The Austrians improved their earthworks between 9 and 14 January, and later augmented their batteries with nine pieces of large caliber, brought to the siege after the successful completion of the assault on Kehl, with another several thousand men. Fürstenberg ordered the reinforcement of the ring of soldiers surrounding Hüningen, and day by day, the situation for the garrison within the fortress became more dire. The batteries called Charles and Elizabeth that girded the fortress downstream (see map in box) poured balls and shells into the fort, destroying the pontoons connecting the island fortifications to the mainland on both sides. Eventually the battery Ferdinand (located more or less due east) added to the shelling. The Austrians continued to expand their trenches and redoubts, creating an earthwork along the Swiss border. From these angles, the Austrians could deploy deadly artillery and musketry fire into the French positions.

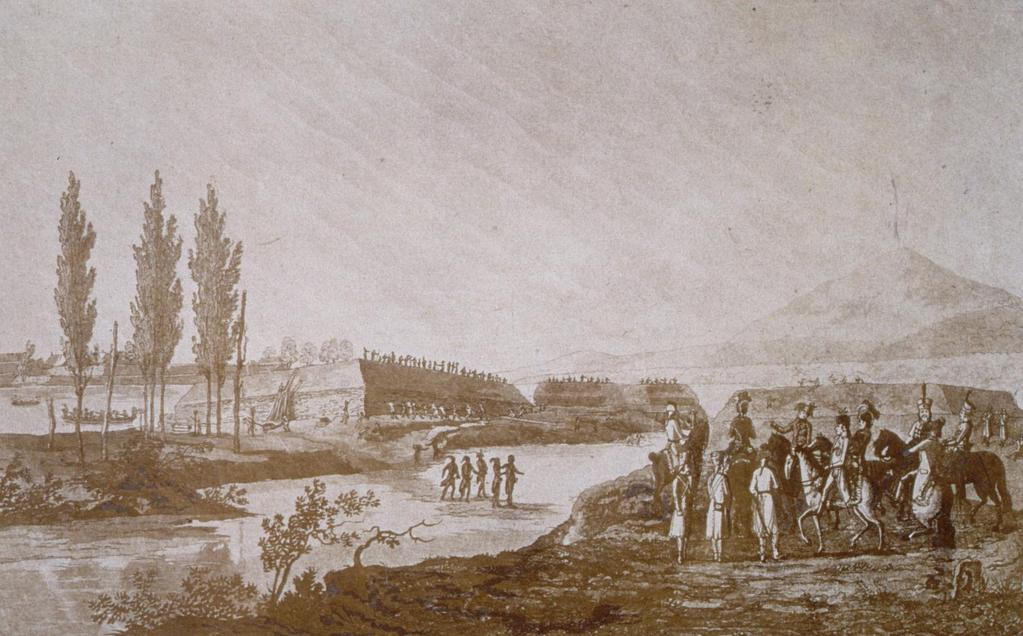
Archduke Charles and his commanders view the cannonade of Hüningen on 2 February 1797

The trenches, opened originally in November, had refilled with winter rain and snow in the intervening weeks. Fürstenberg ordered them opened again, and the water drained out on 25 January. The Habsburgs secured the earthworks surrounding the trenches. On 31 January the French failed to push the Austrians out. Archduke Charles arrived that day and consulted with Fürstenberg at nearby Lörrach. The night of 31 January to 1 February was relatively tranquil, marred only by ordinary artillery fire and shelling. At mid-day 1 February 1797, as the Austrians prepared to storm the bridgehead, General of Division Georges Joseph Dufour, the French commander who had replaced Abbatucci, pre-empted what would have been a costly attack for both sides, offering to surrender the position. On 5 February, Fürstenberg finally took possession of the bridgehead. Like Kehl after the siege, Hüningen was a pile of rubble.

== Orders of battle ==
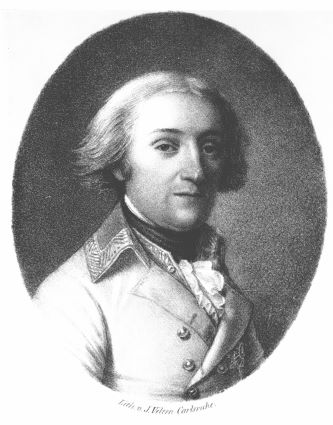
Fürstenberg commanded the Austrian siege.

=== Austrian Order of Battle ===
Contemporary sources place the following at the siege:

Lieutenant General Prince von Fürstenberg, Commanding
First Brigade, Lieutenant General Michael von Fröhlich

Major General Paul Vay de Vaya (Devay)

- 1st Banat squadron (one squadron)
- 2nd Banat and Szekler (one squadron each)
- Hussars Archduke Ferdinand (10 squadrons)

Major General Kovachich

- Regiment Archduke Ferdinand (10 squadrons)
- Regiment Stuart (two battalions)
- Regiment Pellegrini (two battalions)
- Regiment Wenckheim (two battalions)

Major General Wolf

- Regiment Manfredini (one battalion)
- Regiment Bender (three battalions)
- Regiment Wartensleben (one battalion)

Prince Charles Eugene, Prince of Lambesc

- Regiment J'Alton Regiment (three battalions)
- Kavanaugh Cuirassiers (six squadrons)
- Waldeck Dragoons (six squadrons)
- Modene Chev légere (six squadrons)
- Lobkowitz Chev. (six squadrons)

Total 19 battalions and 34 squadrons

=== French Order of Battle ===
Contemporary sources place the following in the garrison:

General Jean Charles Abbatucci, Commanding; Georges Joseph Dufour, Commanding (after 4 December 1796)

- 3rd infantry Demi brigade de légère, (three battalions) (Note: The French Army designated two kinds of infantry: d'infanterie légère, or light infantry, to provide skirmishing cover for the troops that followed, principally d'infanterie de ligne, which fought in tight formations. Smith, p. 15.)
- 56 infantry Demi brigade de ligne (three battalions)
- 89th infantry Demi brigade de ligne (three battalions)

Total: nine battalions, combined skirmishers and line infantry

== Aftermath ==
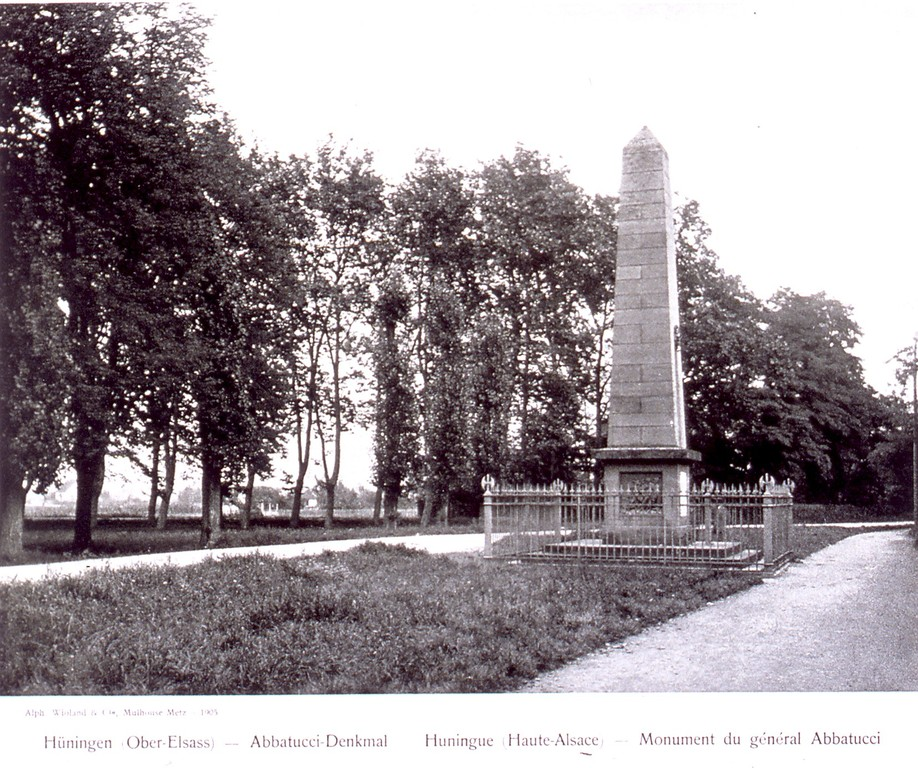
Monument for Jean Charles Abbatucci, 1906

While the Austrians besieged these Rhine crossings, Moreau had sufficient surplus troops to send 14 demi-brigades into Italy to assist in the siege at Mantua. This surplus helped to weigh the siege in favor of the French. The defense of Mantua by the Austrians ended in disaster: Wurmser held out until 2 February. During the siege and blockade, the Austrians reported 16,333 killed and wounded in action or died of disease. In recognition of his stout defense, the old field marshal was freed with his staff and an escort of 700 soldiers and 6 cannon. The rest of the garrison marched out with the honors of war and were paroled on the condition not to fight against Austria or the Coalition until exchanged.

In terms of local casualties at Hüningen, the French lost almost 30% of their force. Most casualties occurred in November and December during sorties to dislodge the besiegers before they could complete their circumvallation. In addition, 25-year-old Jean Charles Abbatucci, a rising star in the French military, was killed in early December. With the capitulation, the remaining troops marched out unharmed. Austrian casualties were light, and after three months of siege, they were able to take possession of a pile of rubble.

There were personal victories. After the capitulation, Francis II, the Holy Roman Emperor, appointed Fürstenberg as Colonel and Proprietor of the Infantry Regiment Nr. 36, which bore his name until his death in battle in 1799. For Charles, success at Hüningen represented a victorious conclusion of the campaign for which he acquired the name Savior of Germany.

General Moreau established a monument for Abbatucci in the center of the village, but it was destroyed during the Napoleonic Wars. The fortress was besieged again from 22 December 1813 until 14 April 1814 by Bavarian troops under the command of General Zoller before the French garrison surrendered. The monument was not rebuilt until after the July Monarchy. The town market square is still named in Abbatucci's honor.

== Sources ==
- Alison, Archibald. History of Europe from the Commencement of the French Revolution to the Restoration of the Bourbons, Volume 3. Edinburgh, W. Blackwood, 1847.
- (in German) Charles, Archduke of Austria. Ausgewählte Schriften weiland seiner kaiserlichen Hoheit des Erzherzogs Carl von Österreich. Wien, W. Braumüller, 1893–94.
- Blanning, Timothy. The French Revolutionary Wars, New York, Oxford University Press, 1998. ISBN 978-0-340-56911-5
- Bourdet, Jacques. The Ancient Art of Warfare: The Modern Ages; 1700 to Our Times, From Peter the Great to Eisenhower, Soldiers of Cannons, Tanks, and Planes. Volume 2: The Ancient Art of Warfare. R. Laffont, 1968. OCLC 21409
- Cuccia, Phillip. Napoleon in Italy: the Sieges of Mantua, 1796–1799, University of Oklahoma Press, 2014. ISBN 978-0-8061-4445-0
- (in German) Degen, Bernard. "Huningen." in Lexicon der Schweiz. Accessed 27 October 2014.
- Dodge, Theodore Ayrault. Warfare in the Age of Napoleon: the Revolutionary Wars against the First Coalition in Northern Europe and the Italian Campaign, 1789–1797. Leonaur LTD: 2011. ISBN 978-0-85706-598-8.
- (in German) Ebert, Jens-Florian. "Feldmarschall-Leutnant Fürst zu Fürstenberg." Die Österreichischen Generäle 1792–1815. Napoleon Online: Portal zu Epoch. Markus Stein, editor. Mannheim, Germany. 14 February 2010 version. Accessed 5 February 2010.
- Eysturlid, Lee W. The Formative Influences, Theories, and Campaigns of the Archduke Carl. Greenwood Publishing Group, 2000. ISBN 0-313-30996-5
- Hansard, Thomas (ed.). Hansard's Parliamentary Debates, House of Commons, 1803, Official Report. Vol. 1. London: HMSO, 1803, pp. 249–252.
- (in French) Joanne, Adolphe. Trains de plaisir aux bords du Rhin: tinéraire descriptif et historique, Libr. de L. Hachette et Cie. 1863.
- Knepper, Thomas P. The Rhine. Handbook for Environmental Chemistry Series, Part L. New York, Springer, 2006, ISBN 978-3-540-29393-4.
- Malte-Brun, Conrad. Universal Geography, Or, a Description of All the Parts of the World, on a New Plan: Spain, Portugal, France, Norway, Sweden, Denmark, Belgium, and Holland. A. Black, 1831.
- (in French) Mechel, Christian von, Tableaux historiques et topographiques ou relation exacte .... Basel, 1798, pp. 9–10.
- (in French) Mullié, Charles. "Jean Charles Abbatucci" in Biographie des célébrités militaires des armées de terre et de mer de 1789 à 1850, Paris, 1852.
- Philippart, John. Memoirs, &c. &c. of General Moreau. London, 1814.
- Phipps, Ramsay Weston. The Armies of the First French Republic: Volume II The Armées du Moselle, du Rhin, de Sambre-et-Meuse, de Rhin-et-Moselle. US, Pickle Partners Publishing 2011 reprint of original publication 1920–32. ISBN 978-1-908692-25-2
- Rickard, J. "Siege of Huningue, 26 October 1796 – 19 February 1797". History of war.org. 17 February 2009 version. Accessed 1 November 2014.
- Rickard, J. ( Battle of Emmendingen. History of war.org. 17 February 2009 version. Accessed 18 November 2014.
- Rotteck, Carl von. General History of the World. C. F. Stollmeyer, 1842. OCLC 653511
- Smith, Digby. Napoleonic Wars Data Book. Mechanicsburg, PA: Stackpole, 1999. ISBN 978-1-85367-276-7
- Vann, James Allen. The Swabian Kreis: Institutional Growth in the Holy Roman Empire 1648–1715. Vol. LII, Studies Presented to International Commission for the History of Representative and Parliamentary Institutions. Bruxelles, Les Éditions de la Librairie Encyclopédique, 1975. OCLC 2276157
- (in German) Volk, Helmut. "Landschaftsgeschichte und Natürlichkeit der Baumarten in der Rheinaue." Waldschutzgebiete Baden-Württemberg, Band 10, pp. 159–167.
- Walker, Mack. German Home Towns: Community, State, and General Estate, 1648–1871. Ithaca, Cornell University Press, 1998. ISBN 0-8014-0670-6
- Whaley, Joachim. Germany and the Holy Roman Empire: Volume I: Maximilian I to the Peace of Westphalia, 1493–1648 pp. 17–20. Oxford, Oxford University Press, 2012. ISBN 978-0-19-873101-6
