= Paul Vay de Vaya =

Paul Freiherr Vay de Vaya
- Born: 4 August 1735; Gyöngyös, Hungary
- Died: December 24, 1800 (aged 65)
- Allegiance: Habsburg Monarchy
- Branch: Hussars
- Service years: 1758–1900
- Rank: Feldmarschall-leutnant
- Conflicts: Seven Years' War; French Revolutionary Wars
- Awards: Knights Cross of the Military Order of Maria Theresa 1794

Paul Freiherr Vay de Vaya (also spelled Dévay) was born 4 August 1735 in Gyöngyös Hungary and died 24 December 1800. He served in the Habsburg military, as a Major General, from 11 June 1794 – 19 April 1794, and was promoted to Feldmarschall-leutnant in February 1799. He retired in 1799, and died a year later. He fought in the Rhine Campaign of 1796, and participated at the Battle of Schliengen and the Siege of Hüningen.

== Life ==
Little is known of his background, although Constant von Wurzbach suggests he was the son of Adam Vay and his first wife Christine, Baroness Pongratz. As a young man, he joined a Hussar regiment and served in the Seven Years' War as a cornet in the Töröl Hussars, and during this period, which tested his courage and leadership, was promoted to Rittmeister, or captain of Hussars. At the outbreak of the French Wars in 1790, he was colonel of the Esterhazy Hussars N. 3, and on 26 July 1792, he led two of the regiments at Longwy against the advanced guard of the French, including General Lafayette, and pushed them back to Luxembourg. In the following year, he participated in the Battle of Neerwinden, then at Maubeuge. He received command of the forward post in Luxemburg.

At Saint-Saulve and Saultain, he led three companies of Serbian Freicorps into the suburbs of Valenciennes during the siege; at Abscon on 20 October the French returned with 10,000 men against his commander, General Otto. He attacked the enemy column with six squadrons of his hussars, light cannon and four companies of infantry. His troops inflicted 600 casualties and brought back with them 60 prisoners, plus ten officers. In 1794, he was raised to the rank of major general, and awarded the Knight's Cross. He received a new charge, a brigade, and fought by Muhlen on 4 October 1794, also at Gundelfingen on 8 August 1796. He served in the Rhine Campaign of 1796. In 1799, during the lull in fighting the French, the Habsburgs sent him to Hungary to suppress a rebellion there.
