= Christian von Mechel =

Swiss engraver, publisher and art dealer

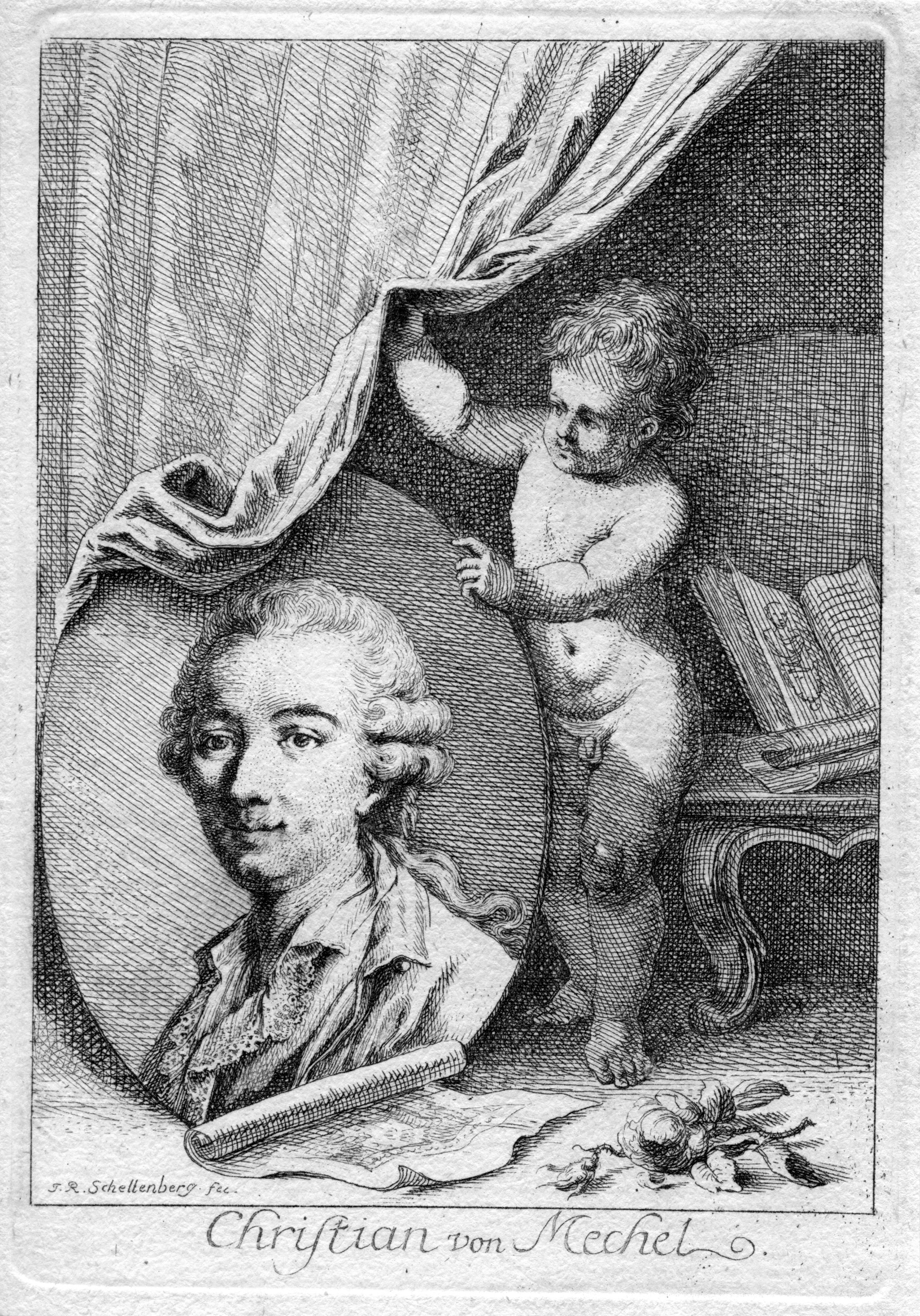
- Engraving of Christian von Mechel, by one of his students.
- Born: Christian von Mechel; 4 April 1737; Basell, Canton Basel
- Died: 11 April 1817 (aged 80); Berlin, Prussia
- Education: Johann Georg Wille
- Known for: Engraving printmaking, Art Dealer, Art Historian
- Notable work: La Galerie Électorale De Dusseldorff (1778) Hans Holbein – Le triomphe de la mort (1780); Verzeichniß der Gemälde der Kaiserlich Königlichen Bilder-Gallerie in Wien (1783); Entwurf einer Kunstgeschichte Helvetiens (1791) Lucas Cranach's Stammbuch (1814); Bildnisse sämmtlicher zu dem Throne von Frankreich zurückberufenen Bourbons (1814)
- Movement: Swiss Classicism
- Patrons: Joseph II, Holy Roman Emperor, Johann Wolfgang von Goethe

Christian von Mechel (4 April 1737 in Basel; † 11 April 1817 in Berlin) was a Swiss engraver, publisher and art dealer. He developed a broad trade in art, through business connections throughout northern and central Europe; although the French Revolutionary Wars ruined him financially, he started over in 1805 in Berlin.

Although trained in art and copper etching, he found his niche as a purveyor of art. Joseph II employed him to convert the private Habsburg collection to one available for public display. He was one of the first curators to employ schools of art as a mnemonic system of organization.

== Life ==
Christian von Mechel came from a long-established family of artisans in Basel. His father John (1813–07) and grandfather Josias both worked as a coopers, and his mother Salome (Bulacher) was the daughter of a guild master; the family name itself dates to the 16th century, and his maternal great-grandfather, Christian Munch (1678–1747) had been master of the guilds and a Basel magistrate. Originally destined for a career in the clergy, Christian Mechel attended the Basel Latin School. Early, however, he showed a marked interest in art. In the 1750s, as construction in Basel flourished, it occurred to his parents that art might be a lucrative business and he was permitted to pursue this study. In 1753 he visited Augsburg to learn the engraving discipline from Georg Daniel Heumann. In 1757 he briefly worked in Johann Georg Pintz's workshop in Nuremberg. From 1757 to 1764 he lived in Paris, where he studied with Johann Georg Wille and later launched his own studio, where he produced his own work and sold other objets d'art. In 1761, he married Elisabeth Haas (1740–86), the daughter of a respected type caster Johannes Wilhelm Haas from Nuremberg. In 1795, he married again to Friederike von Wagner, daughter of the banker and financier Ludwig Friedrich von Wagner, of Regensburg, but they divorced the following year. Both marriages were childless.

== Business venture ==
Mechel thrived in Paris, learning how to deal with rich clients and developing a feel for the art market. Soon, the businessman, the art dealer and the artist were combined into one; he began signing his name to works produced by talented apprentices and selling them as his own. He returned to Basel in 1765 and in 1766 opened a large art dealer's business and engraving workshop in the St. Johannes quarter of the city (the Vorstadt). He no longer produced anything himself, but supervised 12-15 artists. His shop became a tourist destination in and of itself, promoted by his own excellent connections. As his reputation grew, travelers stopped at his shop in the Vorstadt to buy his prints. He maintained a large magazine of prints, and carried on a sizable trade. Mechel soon became known internationally in the art trade and acquired such important and famous customers as Johann Wolfgang von Goethe and Emperor Joseph, who visited the Mechel studio during his stay in Basel in July 1777. Mechel later accompanied the emperor on his journey to Waldshut on 26 July 1777.

On a trip to Italy in 1767, Mechel met Johann Joachim Winckelmann and Johann Friedrich Reiffenstein, who regularly supplied him with Italian art for sale in his studio and shop. He taught applied drawing at the University of Basel and, in 1786, Mechel was officially entrusted with the supervision of Basel's Hans Holbein the Younger collection. He also held an office in the Basel Magistrates, in the select inner council. During these productive years, he published several volumes, including Vorstellungen und Plane der merkwürdigsten Begebenheiten des gegenwärtigen Krieges der Österreicher und Russen gegen die Türken (1790) (Ideas and plans of the most remarkable events of the present war the Austrians and Russians against the Turks);Explication des renvois de l'estampe enluminée, qui représente la vallé de Chamouni, le Mont-Blanc et les montagnes adjacentes (1791) (Explanation of the print references illuminated, which represents the valley of Chamouni, Mont Blanc and the adjacent mountains) and Entwurf einer Kunstgeschichte Helvetiens (1791) (History of Swiss Art).

=== Participation in development of Imperial Art Gallery ===
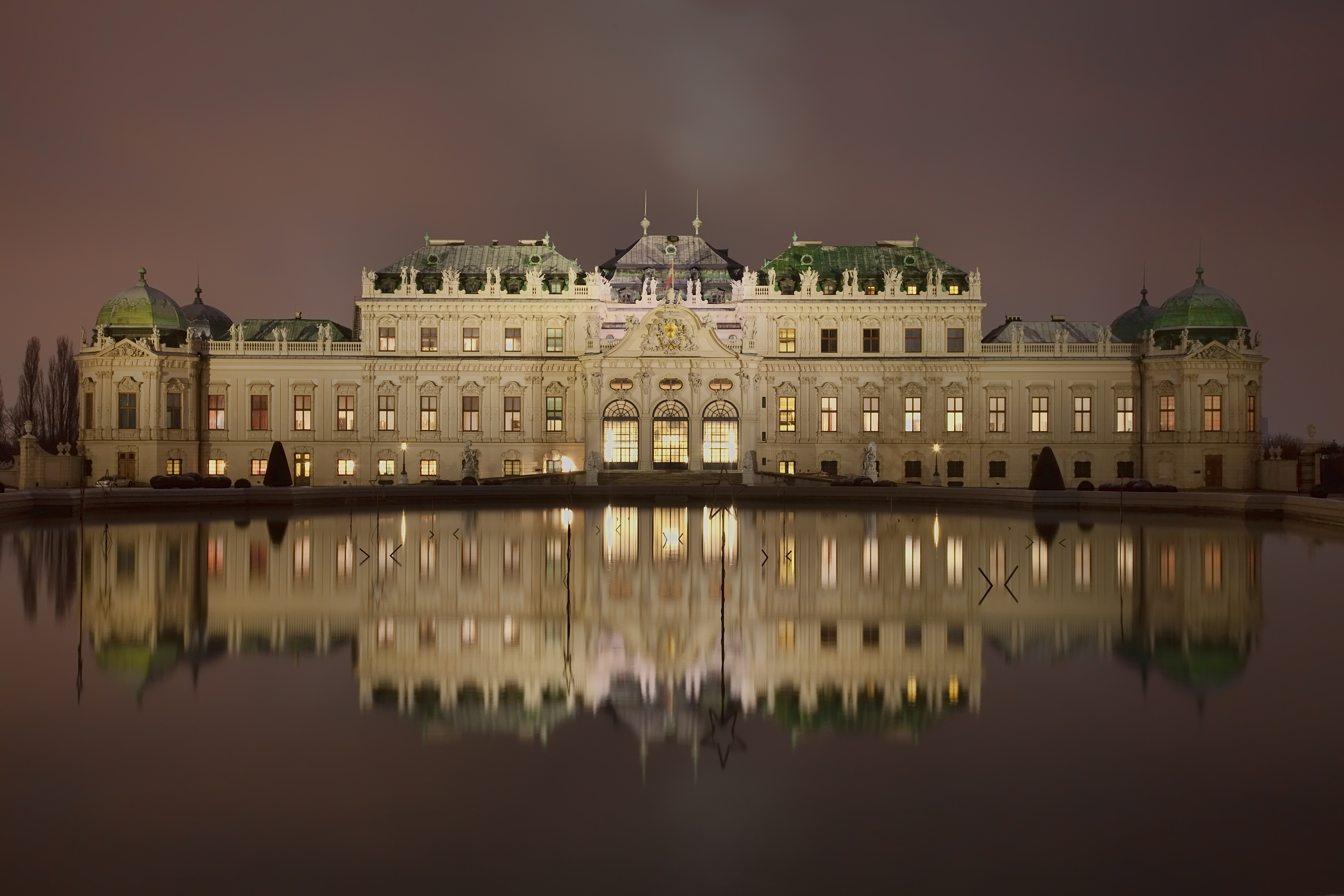
Upper Belvedere at night

In 1776 Maria Theresa and her son, Emperor Joseph II, decided to transfer the k.u.k. Gemäldegalerie ("Imperial Picture Gallery") from the Imperial Stables – a part of the city's Hofburg Imperial Palace – to the Upper Belvedere, and reflected an eighteenth-century trend shaped by the Enlightenment. To display art to the public required also a shift in perspective. Art, including sculpture, paintings, lithographs, drawings, etc. had been considered for years the domain of the upper classes for who it was deemed suitable. To display such treasures to the hoi polloi required, the cultured and refined classes believed, explanations to the unlettered and uninformed. Consequently, Joseph entrusted Mechel with the organization, cataloging and display of his large and important collection. To prepare the art for exhibit, Joseph wished Mechel to organize, catalog. Mechel applied a scientific perspective to organize works of art by masters, time periods, and schools that was emulated, copied, and expanded throughout European art collectors and their curators. and display what became known as the Imperial Picture Gallery for public showing. (Note: After Mechel, a series of eminent painters served as directors in charge of the imperial collection in the Upper Belvedere until 1891, when the collection was transferred to the newly built Kunsthistorisches Museum (Museum of Fine Arts) on Vienna's Ringstrasse. The idea that commoners could understand and appreciate the fine arts suggested that art museums perpetuate aristocratic and upper class ideals of taste and excludes segments of society without the social opportunities to develop such interest. On the one hand, a public (or national) art museum allowed all members of the nation to view these fine pieces of art; on the other hand, not all members of the nation could own such pieces of art. The fine arts thus perpetuate social inequality by creating divisions between different social groups. See Pierre. Bourdieu, Richard Nice (trans). Distinction: A Social Critique of the Judgement of Taste. Harvard University Press, 1984. ISBN 0-7100-9609-7.) The gallery opened five years later, making it one of the first public museums in the world. The opening of the Musée du Louvre during the French Revolution in 1793 as a public museum included much of the former French royal collection marked an important stage in the development of public access to art by transferring the ownership to a republican state; but it was a continuation of trends already well established. Michel was also instrumental in organizing and cataloging this material.

=== Work during the French Revolutionary Wars and Napoleonic Wars ===
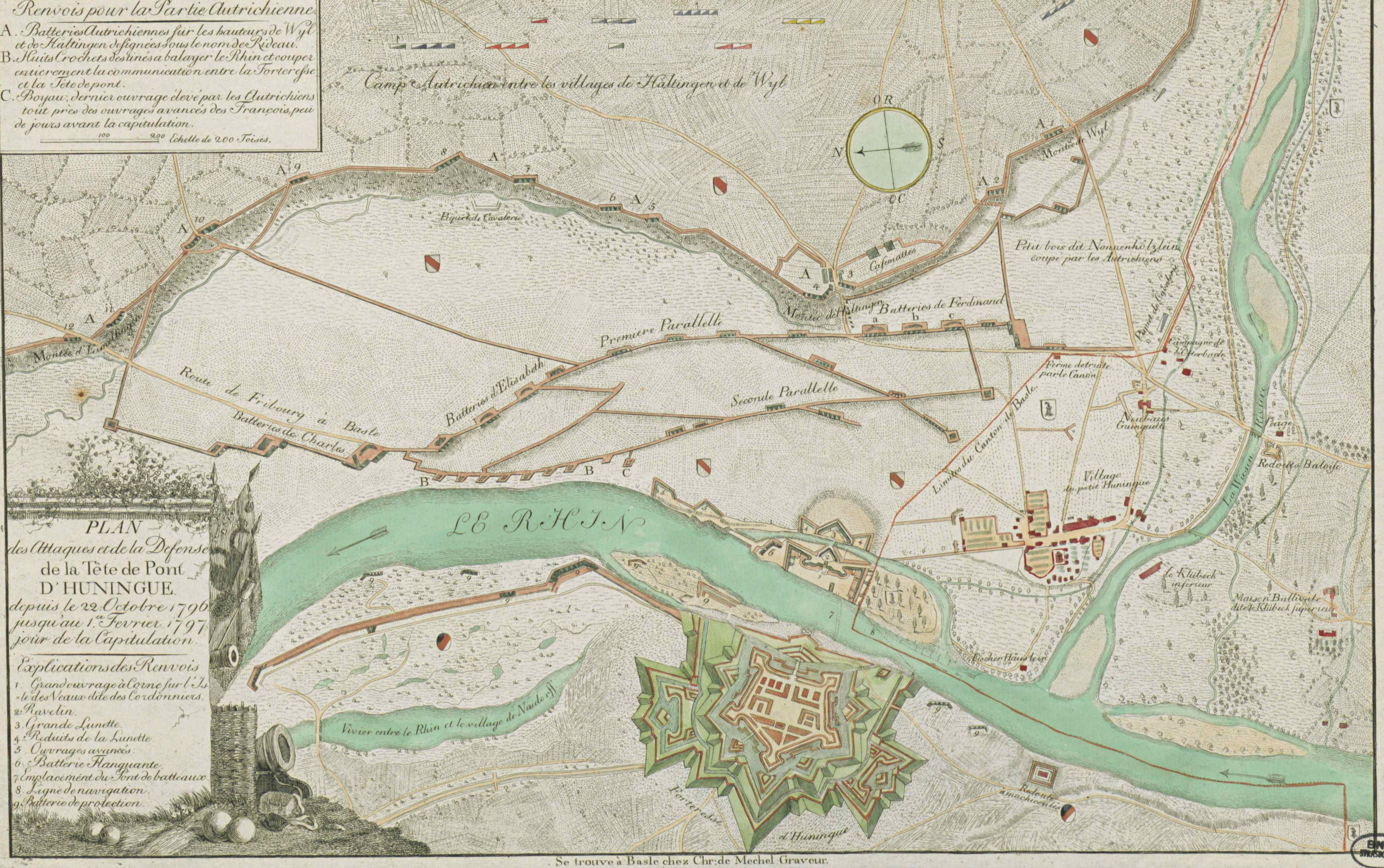
Exemplar of Mechel's work in 1797

A trip through the southern German states followed another trip to Vienna in 1787. In 1789, he traveled again through southern Germany, the Rhineland, and the Netherlands; once in the Netherlands, he went to England, to the Court of George III. In 1794 he returned to Basel, where he saw the impact of the French Revolution on his art dealing business. Fighting in and around Basel, both the city Canton and the countryside, made business difficult. In 1796, he was directly affected by the Rhine Campaign; from his home in Basel he could see the nearby Hüningen, drawings of which he published in 1797. Complicating matters for him, his business suffered due to the lack of tourists purchasing his art and prints, and because of the general lack of money. His publication of, for example, Itinéraire du St. Gothard, d'une partie de Vallais et des contrées de la Suisse, que l'on traverse ordinairement pour se rendre au Gothard (1795) (The St. Gotthard Itinerary: part of Vallais and regions of Switzerland; and Views of Switzerland drew on the popularity of emerging importance of the Grand Tour for the wealthy.

With such political turmoil, people had other things upon which to spend their time and energy. Mechel attempted to capitalize on local events in the ongoing warfare with France with the publication of Tableaux historiques et topographiques, ou relations exactes et impartiales des trois événemens mémorables qui terminèrent la campagne de 1796 sur le Rhin (1798) (Historical and topographical paintings, accurate and impartial relationship or three memorable events that ended the 1796 campaign on the Rhine); and Soldaten- und Plotons-Schule für die Infanterie aus dem französischen Reglement (1799) (Note: See Mechel's School for Infantry.) During the mid-1790s he speculated, often unwisely, in the purchase of art from large collections from the French emigre noble families. These ventures, mostly unsuccessful, forced him into bankruptcy.

The political and economic turmoil caused by the French revolutionary wars made him country-less and homeless and in 1797 he fled Basel. For several years, Mechel traveled throughout Germany, moving from city to city, often on foot, plying his knowledge of art, cataloging and organization in exchange for shelter and sustenance. At a stop in Frankfurt am Main, he cataloged the artwork of the Dominican monastery, then moved on to Kassel and Weimar, where he met again with Goethe, and made the acquaintance of Schiller. In Dresden he furthered his acquaintance with the Swiss painters Anton Graff and Adrian Zingg and finally settled in Berlin in 1805. There he negotiated his membership in the Royal Academy of Art. In 1806disbanded his ruined business in Basel and seemed to find some stability. Afterward, he produced, in collaboration with Wilhelm von Humboldt and others, luxurious printed editions showcasing the work of such Reformation artists as Lucius Cranach the Younger. He never again attained the wealth and influence he had wielded for those twenty years in Basel. He died in 1817 in Berlin.

== Importance ==
In addition to his work of selling art, Mechel developed a wide audience for Hans Holbein the Younger with his work on Totentanz. As president of the Swiss Society for Art Galleries, which he founded in 1791, he wrote the first art history of Switzerland.

Mechel was also one of the first art historians to create art exhibits based on the newly developed concept of painting schools. His organization of the Habsburg collection by "schools" (for example, Italian schools, Dutch schools, etc.) and his physical placement of these in specific rooms, one leading to another, as if leading the viewer through a timeline of development, laid the groundwork for the form of art history. Furthermore, his business in Basel made him an important man. He became a Ratsherr (member of the city council) and a member of Isaac Iselin's Helvetic Society, among the most enlightened and liberal members of Basel elite.

== Works ==
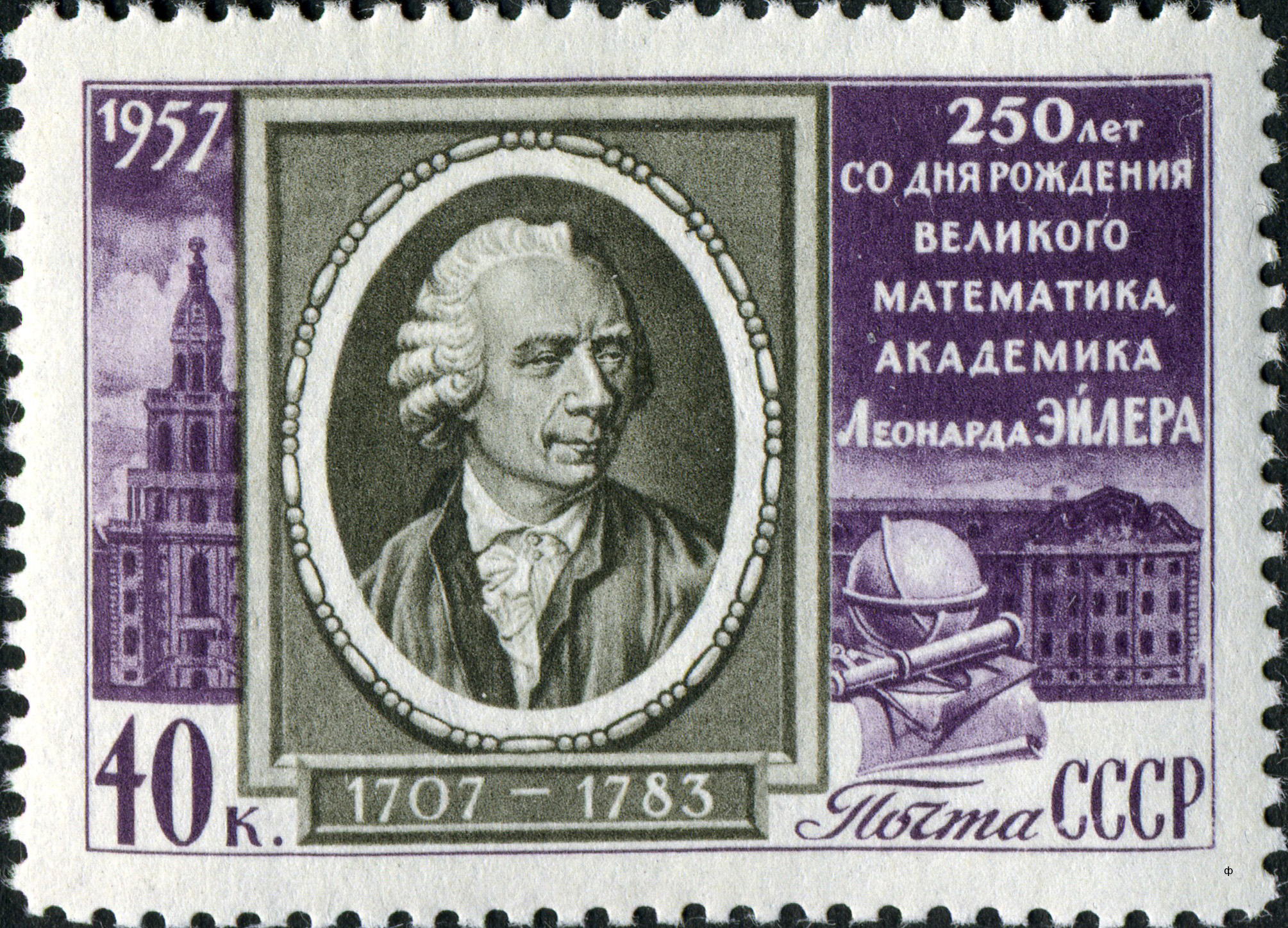
Portrait of Leonhard Euler (1707–1783)

- Oeuvre du Chevalier Hedlinger ou recueil des medailles de ce celebre artiste (1776)
- La Galerie Électorale De Dusseldorff (1778)
- Hans Holbein – Le triomphe de la mort (1780)
- Verzeichniß der Gemälde der Kaiserlich Königlichen Bilder-Gallerie in Wien (1783)
- Karl Gottlieb von Windisch's Briefe über den Schachspieler des Hrn. von Kempelen (1783)
- Costumes de Paysans et Paysannes de la Suisse (1785)
- Vorstellungen und Plane der merkwürdigsten Begebenheiten des gegenwärtigen Krieges der Österreicher und Russen gegen die Türken (1790)
- Explication des renvois de l'estampe enluminée, qui représente la vallé de Chamouni, le Mont-Blanc et les montagnes adjacentes (1791)
- Entwurf einer Kunstgeschichte Helvetiens (1791)
- Itinéraire du St. Gothard, d'une partie de Vallais et des contrées de la Suisse, que l'on traverse ordinairement pour se rendre au Gothard (1795)
- Recueil de Vues choisies de la Suisse (1796)
- Tableaux historiques et topographiques, ou relations exactes et impartiales des trois événemens mémorables qui terminèrent la campagne de 1796 sur le Rhin (1798)
- Soldaten- und Plotons-Schule für die Infanterie aus dem französischen Reglement (1799)
- Plan, Durchschnitt und Aufriß der drey merkwürdigsten hölzernen Brücken in der Schweiz (1803)
- Tableau comparatif des montagnes de la Lune, de Venus, de Mercure et de quelques-unes de plus hautes montagnes de la Terre (1806)
- Lucas Cranach's Stammbuch (1814)
- Bildnisse sämmtlicher zu dem Throne von Frankreich zurückberufenen Bourbons (1814)
- Den gekrönten Befreiern Europas jetzt in Wien versammelt ... widmet die Abbildung der Eisernen Hand des ... Götz von Berlichingen (1815)

== Sources ==
- Bourdieu, Pierre, Richard Nice (trans). Distinction: A Social Critique of the Judgement of Taste. Harvard University Press, 1984.
- Gossman, Lionel. Basel in the Age of Burckhardt: a Study in Unseasonable Ideas. University of Chicago Press, 2002. ISBN 9780226305004
- "Mechel, Christian von". Allgemeine Deutsche Biographie (in German). Vol. 21. Leipzig: Duncker & Humblot. 1885. p. 153.
- D.J.Meyjers. "Places of Painting: Survival of Mnemotechnics in Christian von Mechel's Gallery Arrangement in Vienna (1779–81)." In Memory and Oblivion: Proceedings of the XXIXth International Congress of the History of Art held in Amsterdam, 1–7 September 1996, Kluwer Academic Holdings, Springer Press, 1996, pp. 205–211, 205 cited. ISBN 978-94-010-5771-4
- (in German) Marti-Weissenbach, Karin. Christian von Mechel. Historisches Lexicon der Schweiz. Accessed 5 November 2014.

== Other resources ==
- Lucas Heinrich Wüthrich: Christian von Mechel: Leben und Werk eines Basler Kupferstechers und Kunsthändlers (1737–1817). ("Christian von Mechel. The life and work of a Basel engraver") Basel 1956 (in German).
- (in German) Lucas Heinrich Wüthrich: Pietistische Briefe des jungen Christian von Mechel an dem Pfarrer Hieronymus d'Annone. Helbing & Lichtenhahn, Basel 1956.
- Lucas Heinrich Wüthrich: Pietist letters of the young Christian von Mechel to the priest Jerome d'Custard . In: Scripta Manent . 4, 1958.
- (in German) Lucas Heinrich Wüthrich: Das Oeuvre des Kupferstechers Christian von Mechel : vollständiges Verzeichnis der von ihm geschaffenen und verlegten graphischen Arbeiten. 4, 1958.
- Lucas Heinrich Wüthrich: The body of work of the engraver Christian von Mechel: full list of jobs created and installed by him graphic works . Helbing & Lichtenhahn, Basel 1959.
- (in German) Lucas Heinrich Wüthrich: Ein schweizerischer Kultursöldner. Helbing & Lichtenhahn, Basel 1959.
- Lucas Heinrich Wüthrich: A Culture of Swiss mercenaries . In: Basler Nachrichten. Nr. 135, 13. Juni 1975, S. 17.
