= Anne Marie François Boisgérard =

- Born: 8 July 1767; Tonnerre, Yonne, France
- Died: 9 February 1799 (aged 31) Capua, Parthenopaean Republic
- Conflicts: French Revolutionary Wars

Anne Marie François Barbuat de Maison-Rouge de Boisgérard, born 8 July 1767 in Tonnerre, Department Yonne in Burgundy, France, was a French general in the Revolutionary Wars. He directed the engineering defence of Kehl during the 1796 siege. He served in the Republican army from 1791 to his death on 9 February 1799 during the Siege of Capua.

He was the son of the General of Brigade Jacques François Barbuat de Maison-Rouge de Boisgérard (1739-1815).

== See also ==
- List of French generals of the Revolutionary and Napoleonic Wars

== Sources ==
- Six, Georges (1934). Dictionnaire biographique des généraux et amiraux de la Révolution et de l'Empire, Vol. I (in French). Paris, France: Librairie historique et nobiliaire. ISBN 978-2-402-49916-3.
