= Jean-Baptiste Lobréau =

French soldier, recipient of the Legion d'honneur

Jean-Baptiste Lobréau ("Citizen Lobréau" in dispatches; 1748–1822) was a French Legion of Honour soldier.

Lobréau was born 24 March 1748 in Hautvilliers, Champagna, which is present-day Marne. He was the son of Gerard Lobreau, a physician, and d'Élisabeth Macquart and married Marie Barbe Eulalie Graillet. He entered the service as a cannonier in the 2nd artillery regiment of Metz, and fought in Corsica from 1768 to 1769; in 1769 French victory at the Battle of Ponte Novu ended Corsica's brief period of sovereignty. Subsequently, he embarked with the squadron of Admiral D'Estaign to participate in the Yorktown Campaign in 1782 and 1783. After fighting in the Wars against the First Coalition, in particular in northern Italy and the Rhine Campaign of 1796, during which he commanded the artillery at the siege at Kehl, he returned to France, where he supervised the construction of the fortifications of Brest. He received the cross of the Legion of Honour.

== Service ==
- Enlisted, 27 October 1767
- Promoted to Sergeant,6 October 1777, with distinction
- Sergeant Major, 11 April 1782
- Lieutenant 1791
- Captain, 1792
- Chef de Brigade (Colonel) 3rd Regiment, 1792
