= John Philippart =

John Philippart (1784?–1874) was a British military writer.

Born in London about 1784, Philippart was educated at a military academy, and was subsequently placed in the office of a Scottish solicitor. His inclinations, however, tended more to military than to legal studies. In 1809 he became private secretary to John Baker-Holroyd, 1st Baron (later 1st Earl of) Sheffield, the President of the Board of Agriculture, and two years later he was appointed a clerk in the War Office. He proposed, in pamphlets issued in 1812 and 1813, the establishment of a benefit fund for officers, an idea suggested by Colonel D. Roberts. The scheme was supported by persons of influence in the profession, but it failed owing to the fear on the part of ministers that such a combination might weaken the discipline of the army. Philippart also suggested, in a further pamphlet, a means of rendering the militia available for foreign service, and part of his plan was adopted by Lord Castlereagh. Philippart was one of the body of members of the order of St. John of Jerusalem, or knights-hospitallers, who contributed to the revival of the English langue.

He was elected a knight of St. John of Jerusalem on 11 November 1830, chevalier of justice in 1831, and bailiff ad honores in 1847. He was chancellor of the order for forty-three years, and outlived all the knights who had revived the English langue except the Chevalier Philippe de Chastelain. His interest in the duties of a knight-hospitaller induced him to aid in founding in 1856 the West London Hospital, which was originally called the Fulham and Hammersmith General Dispensary. He was honorary treasurer of the institution from 1856 to 1861, and an active member of the committee from that date until his death. He was created a knight of the Swedish orders of Gustavus Vasa and of the Polar Star in 1832. He died at his residence, College House, Church Lane, Hammersmith, in 1874.

Philippart was an industrious compiler of many books of reference relating to the army. From October 1812 to September 1814 he owned and edited a journal called The Military Panorama. In 1813 he published his Northern Campaigns, from ... 1812 ... June 4, 1813, with an appendix, containing all the Bulletins issued by the French Ruler, in two volumes. To the same class belong his Royal Military Calendar, containing the Services of every general officer ... in the British Army ... and Accounts of the Operations of the Army under Lieut.-Gen. Sir John Murray on the Eastern Coast of Spain in 1812–13, London, 3 volumes 1815–16, and The East India Military Calendar, 1823.

Among other works by Philippart were Memoirs of the Prince Royal of Sweden, 1813; Memoirs of General Moreau, &c., London, 1814; General Index to the first and second series of Hansard's Parliamentary Debates, London, 1834; Memoir of ... Prince Edward, Duke of Kent and Strathearn and volume II of Queen Victoria, from her Birth to her Bridal, London, 1840.

The publisher Henry Colburn employed Philippart as editor of the Naval and Military Gazette from its first issue, and of the United Service Magazine after its relaunch in 1842.
