= Battle of Rastatt (1796) =

Battle of the War of the First Coalition

Coordinates: 48°51′N 08°12′E

- Part of the Rhine Campaign of 1796
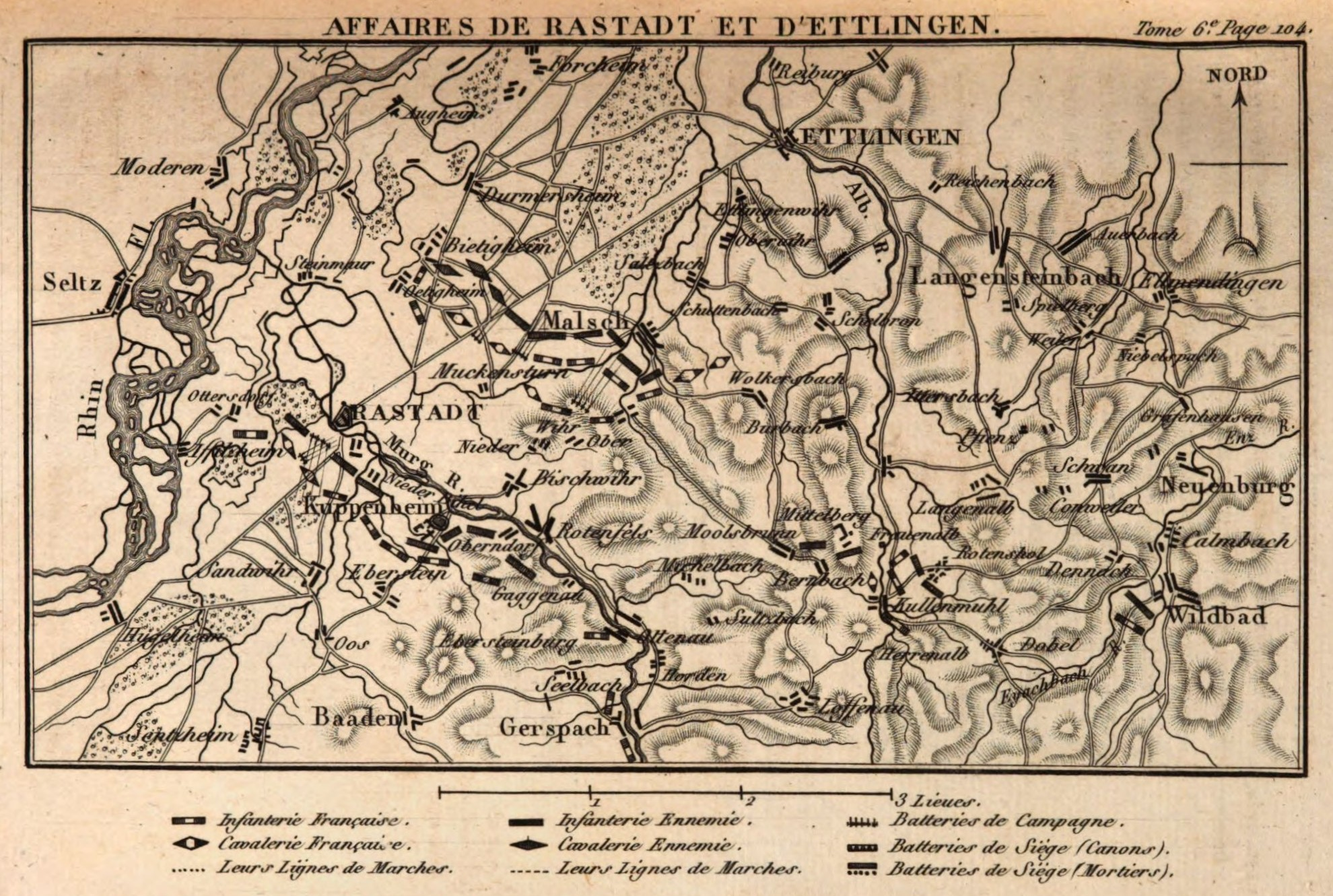
- Map of the engagements at Rattstat and Ettlingen (1818)
Date	5 July 1796
Location	Rastatt, Baden-Württemberg, present-day Germany
Result	French victory

Belligerents
(France) French Republic	Habsburg monarchy

Commanders and leaders
(France) Jean Moreau (France) Louis Desaix	(Habsburg monarchy) Count Latour

Units involved
(France) Army of Rhin-et-Moselle	(Habsburg monarchy) Army of the Upper Rhine

Strength
20,500	6,000

Casualties and losses
unknown	200, 3 guns

The Battle of Rastatt (5 July 1796) saw part of a Republican French army under Jean Victor Marie Moreau clash with elements of the Habsburg army under Maximilian Anton Karl, Count Baillet de Latour which were defending the line of the Murg River. Leading a wing of Moreau's army, Louis Desaix attacked the Austrians and drove them back to the Alb River in the War of the First Coalition action. Rastatt is a city in the state of Baden-Württemberg in Germany, located 89 kilometers (55 mi) south of Mannheim and 94 kilometres (58 mi) west of Stuttgart.

In the Rhine Campaign of 1796, Moreau's army made a successful assault crossing of the Rhine River at Kehl on 24 June. Moreau expanded his bridgehead, sending Desaix north, Laurent Gouvion Saint-Cyr east and Pierre Marie Barthélemy Ferino south. The French won a clash over Anton Sztáray at Renchen on the 28th before moving against Latour at Rastatt. Soon afterward, Archduke Charles, Duke of Teschen joined Latour with reinforcements from the north. The Battle of Ettlingen on 9 July determined whether Moreau would continue his invasion of Germany.

== Background ==
The Rhine Campaign of 1795 (April 1795 to January 1796) opened when two Habsburg armies under the overall command of François Sébastien Charles Joseph de Croix, Count of Clerfayt defeated an attempt by two Republican French armies to cross the Rhine River and capture the Fortress of Mainz. At the start of the campaign the French Army of the Sambre and Meuse led by Jean-Baptiste Jourdan confronted Clerfayt's Army of the Lower Rhine in the north, while the French Army of Rhine and Moselle under Pichegru lay opposite Dagobert Sigmund von Wurmser's army in the south. In August, Jourdan crossed and quickly seized Düsseldorf. The Army of the Sambre and Meuse advanced south to the Main River, completely isolating Mainz. Pichegru's army made a surprise capture of Mannheim so that both French armies held significant footholds on the east bank of the Rhine. The French fumbled away the promising start to their offensive. Pichegru bungled at least one opportunity to seize Clerfayt's supply base in the Battle of Handschuhsheim. With Pichegru unexpectedly inactive, Clerfayt massed against Jourdan, beat him at Höchst in October and forced most of the Army of the Sambre and Meuse to retreat to the west bank of the Rhine. About the same time, Wurmser sealed off the French bridgehead at Mannheim. With Jourdan temporarily out of the picture, the Austrians defeated the left wing of the Army of Rhine and Moselle at the Battle of Mainz and moved down the west bank. In November, Clerfayt gave Pichegru a drubbing at Pfeddersheim and successfully wrapped up the Siege of Mannheim. In January 1796, Clerfayt concluded an armistice with the French, allowing the Austrians to retain large portions of the west bank. During the campaign Pichegru had entered into negotiations with French Royalists. It is debatable whether Pichegru's treason or bad generalship was the actual cause of the French failure. which lasted until 20 May 1796, when the Austrians announced that it would end on 31 May. This set the stage for continued action during the campaign months of May through October 1796.

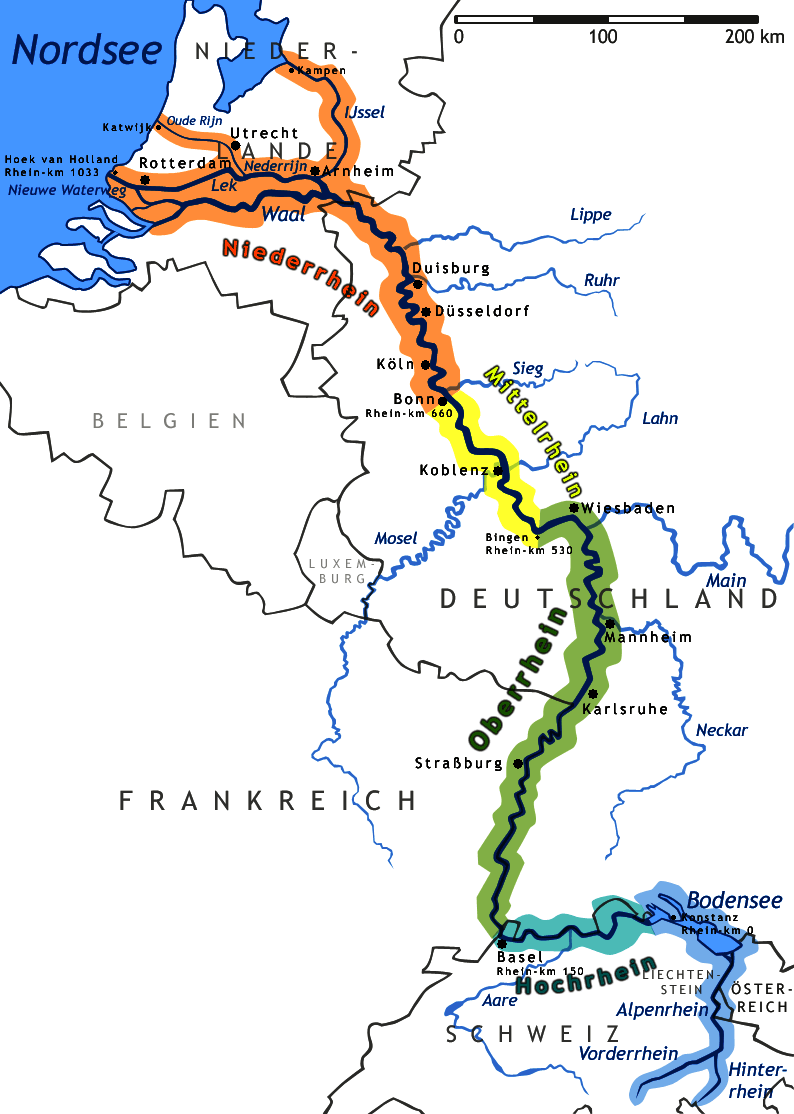
The Rhine River prevented easy escape into France.

=== Terrain ===
The Rhine River flows west along the border between the German states and the Swiss Cantons. The 80-mile (130 km) stretch between Rheinfall, by Schaffhausen and Basel, the High Rhine cuts through steep hillsides over a gravel bed; in such places as the former rapids at Laufenburg, it moved in torrents. A few miles north and east of Basel, the terrain flattens. The Rhine makes a wide, northerly turn, in what is called the Rhine knee, and enters the so-called Rhine ditch (Rheingraben), part of a rift valley bordered by the Black Forest on the east and Vosges Mountains on the west. In 1796, the plain on both sides of the river, some 19 miles (31 km) wide, was dotted with villages and farms. At both far edges of the flood plain, especially on the eastern side, the old mountains created dark shadows on the horizon. Tributaries cut through the hilly terrain of the Black Forest, creating deep defiles in the mountains. The tributaries then wind in rivulets through the flood plain to the river.

The Rhine River itself looked different in the 1790s than it does in the twenty-first century; the passage from Basel to Iffezheim was "corrected" (straightened) between 1817 and 1875. Between 1927 and 1975, a canal was constructed to control the water level. In the 1790s, the river was wild and unpredictable, in some places four or more times wider than the twenty-first century incarnation of the river, even under regular conditions. Its channels wound through marsh and meadow, and created islands of trees and vegetation that were periodically submerged by floods. It was crossable at Kehl, by Strasbourg, and Hüningen, by Basel, where systems of viaducts and causeways made access reliable.

=== Political complications ===
The German-speaking states on the east bank of the Rhine were part of the vast complex of territories in central Europe called the Holy Roman Empire. The considerable number of territories in the Empire included more than 1,000 entities. Their size and influence varied, from the Kleinstaaterei, the little states that covered no more than a few square miles, or included several non-contiguous pieces, to the small and complex territories of the princely Hohenlohe family branches, to such sizable, well-defined territories as the Kingdoms of Bavaria and Prussia. The governance of these many states varied: they included the autonomous free imperial cities, also of different sizes and influence, from the powerful Augsburg to the minuscule Weil der Stadt; ecclesiastical territories, also of varying sizes and influence, such as the wealthy Abbey of Reichenau and the powerful Archbishopric of Cologne; and dynastic states such as Württemberg. When viewed on a map, the Empire resembled a "patchwork carpet". Both the Habsburg domains and Hohenzollern Prussia also included territories outside the Empire. There were also territories completely surrounded by France that belonged to Württemberg, the Archbishopric of Trier, and Hesse-Darmstadt. Among the German-speaking states, the Holy Roman Empire's administrative and legal mechanisms provided a venue to resolve disputes between peasants and landlords, between jurisdictions, and within jurisdictions. Through the organization of imperial circles, also called Reichskreise, groups of states consolidated resources and promoted regional and organizational interests, including economic cooperation and military protection.

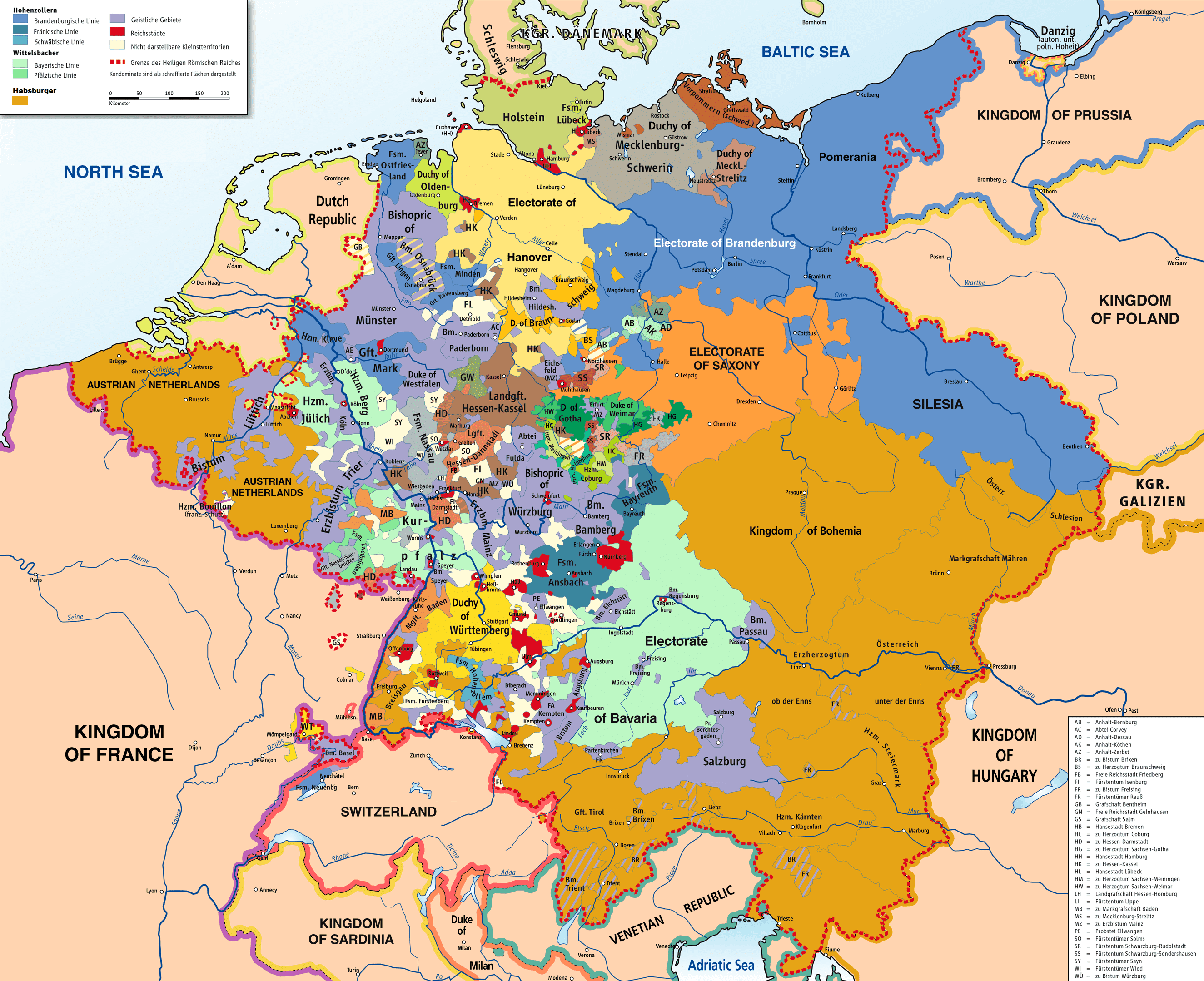
The plethora of states of the Holy Roman Empire was especially dense on the east bank of the Rhine.

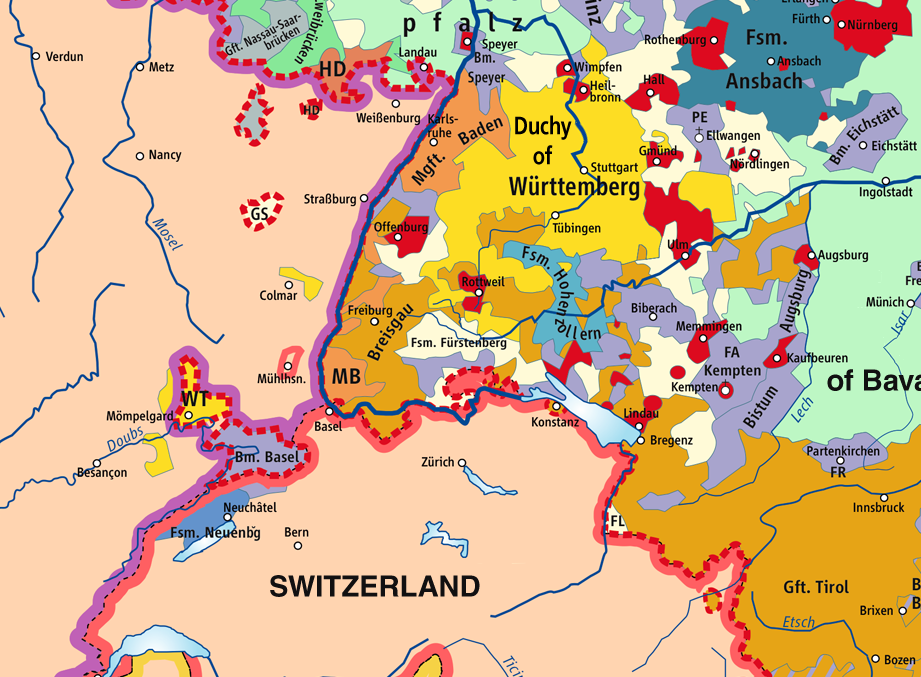
In particular, the states involved in late 1796 included, for example, the Breisgau (Habsburg), Offenburg and Rottweil (free cities), the territories belonging to the princely families of Fürstenberg and Hohenzollern, the Duchy of Baden, the Duchy of Württemberg, and several dozen ecclesiastic polities. Many of these territories were not contiguous: a village could belong predominantly to one polity, but have a farmstead, a house, or even one or two strips of land that belonged to another polity. The light cream-colored territories are so subdivided they cannot be named.

=== Disposition ===
The armies of the First Coalition included the contingents and the infantry and cavalry of the various states, amounted to about 125,000 troops (including the three autonomous corps), a sizable force by eighteenth century standards but a moderate force by the standards of the Revolutionary wars. Archduke Charles, Duke of Teschen and brother of the Holy Roman Emperor, served as commander-in-chief. In total, Charles’ troops stretched in a line from Switzerland to the North Sea. Habsburg troops comprised the bulk of the army but the thin white line of Habsburg infantry could not cover the territory from Basel to Frankfurt with sufficient depth to resist the pressure of the opposition. Compared to French coverage, Charles had half the number of troops covering a 211-mile front, stretching from Renchen, near Basel to Bingen. Furthermore, he had concentrated the bulk of his force, commanded by Count Baillet Latour, between Karlsruhe and Darmstadt, where the confluence of the Rhine and the Main made an attack most likely, as it offered a gateway into eastern German states and ultimately to Vienna, with good bridges crossing a relatively well-defined river bank. To the north, Wilhelm von Wartensleben’s autonomous corps stretched in a thin line between Mainz and Giessen.

In spring 1796, drafts from the free imperial cities, and other imperial estates in the Swabian and Franconian Circles augmented the Habsburg force with perhaps 20,000 men at the most. The militias, most of which were Swabian field hands and day laborers drafted for service in the spring of that year, were untrained and unseasoned. As he gathered his army in March and April, it was largely guess work where they should be placed. In particular, Charles did not like to use the militias in any vital location. Consequently, in May and early June, when the French started to mass troops by Mainz and it looked as if the bulk of the French army would cross there—they even engaged the imperial force at Altenkirchen (4 June) and Wetzler and Uckerath (15 June)—Charles felt few qualms placing the 7000-man Swabian militia at the crossing by Kehl.

== French plans ==
An assault into the German states was essential, as far as French commanders understood, not only in terms of war aims, but also in practical terms: the French Directory believed that war should pay for itself, and did not budget for the feeding of its troops. The French citizen's army, created by mass conscription of young men and systematically divested of old men who might have tempered the rash impulses of teenagers and young adults, had already made itself unwelcome throughout France. It was an army entirely dependent for support upon the countryside it occupied for provisions and wages. Until 1796, wages were paid in the worthless assignat (France's paper currency); after April 1796, although pay was made in metallic value, wages were still in arrears. Throughout that spring and early summer, the French army was in almost constant mutiny: in May 1796, in the border town of Zweibrücken, the 74th Demi-brigade revolted. In June, the 17th Demi-brigade was insubordinate (frequently) and in the 84th Demi-brigade, two companies rebelled.

The French faced a formidable obstacle in addition to the Rhine. The Coalition's Army of the Lower Rhine counted 90,000 troops. The 20,000-man right wing under Duke Ferdinand Frederick Augustus of Württemberg stood on the east bank of the Rhine behind the Sieg River, observing the French bridgehead at Düsseldorf. The garrisons of Mainz Fortress and Ehrenbreitstein Fortress included 10,000 more. The remainder held the west bank behind the Nahe River. Dagobert Sigmund von Wurmser, who initially commanded the whole operation, led the 80,000-strong Army of the Upper Rhine. Its right wing occupied Kaiserslautern on the west bank while the left wing under Anton Sztáray, Michael von Fröhlich and Louis Joseph, Prince of Condé guarded the Rhine from Mannheim to Switzerland. The original Austrian strategy was to capture Trier and to use their position on the Rhine's west bank to strike at each of the French armies in turn. However, after news arrived in Vienna of Napoleon Bonaparte's successes in northern Italy, Wurmser was sent to Italy with 25,000 reinforcements; the Aulic Council gave Archduke Charles command over both Austrian armies and ordered him to hold his ground.

On the French side, the 80,000-man Army of Sambre-et-Meuse held the west bank of the Rhine down to the Nahe and then southwest to Sankt Wendel. On this army's left flank, Jean Baptiste Kléber had 22,000 troops entrenched at Düsseldorf. The right wing of the Army of the Rhine and Moselle, under Jean Victor Moreau's command, was positioned east of the Rhine from Hüningen (on the border with the French provinces, Switzerland, and the German states) northward, with its center along the Queich River near Landau and its left wing extended west toward Saarbrücken. Pierre Marie Barthélemy Ferino commanded Moreau's right wing at Hüningen, Louis Desaix commanded the center and Laurent Gouvion Saint-Cyr directed the left wing and included two divisions commanded by Guillaume Philibert Duhesme, and Alexandre Camille Taponier. Ferino's wing included three infantry and cavalry divisions under François Antoine Louis Bourcier, and general of division Augustin Tuncq, and Henri François Delaborde. Desaix's command included three divisions led by Michel de Beaupuy, Antoine Guillaume Delmas and Charles Antoine Xaintrailles.

The French plan called for its two armies to press against the flanks of the Coalition's northern armies in the German states while simultaneously a third army approached Vienna through Italy. Specifically, Jean-Baptiste Jourdan's army would push south from Düsseldorf, hopefully drawing troops and attention toward themselves, which would allow Moreau's army an easier crossing of the Rhine and Huningen and Kehl. If all went according to plan, Jourdan's army could feint toward Mannheim, which would force Charles to reapportion his troops. Once Charles moved the mass of his army to the north, Moreau's army, which early in the year had been stationed by Speyer, would move swiftly south to Strasbourg. From there, they could cross the river at Kehl, which was guarded by 7,000-man inexperienced and lightly trained militia—troops recruited that spring from the Swabian circle polities. In the south, by Basel, Ferino's column was to move speedily across the river and advanced up the Rhine along the Swiss and German shoreline, toward Lake Constance and spread into the southern end of the Black Forest. Ideally, this would encircle and trap Charles and his army as the left wing of Moreau's army swung behind him, and as Jourdan's force cut off his flank with Wartensleben's autonomous corps. (Note: An autonomous corps, in the Austrian or Imperial armies, was an armed force under command of an experienced field commander. They usually included two divisions, but probably not more than three, and function with high maneuverability and independent action, hence the name "autonomous corps." Some, called the Frei-Corps, or independent corps, were used as light infantry before the official formation of light infantry in the Habsburg Army in 1798. They provided the Army's skirmishing and scouting function; Frei-Corps were usually raised from the provinces, and often acted independently. See Philip Haythornthwaite, Austrian Army of the Napoleonic Wars (1): Infantry. Osprey Publishing, 2012, p. 24. Military historians usually maintain that Napoleon solidified the use of the autonomous corps, armies that could function without a great deal of direction, scatter about the countryside, but reform again quickly for battle; this was actually a development that first emerged first in the French and Indian War in the Thirteen British Colonies and later in the American Revolutionary War, and became widely used in the European military as the size of armies grew in the 1790s and during the Napoleonic Wars. See David Gates, The Napoleonic Wars 1803–1815, New York, Random House, 2011, Chapter 6.)

== Battle ==
=== Preliminary ===
Responding to the French feint, Charles committed most of his forces on the middle and northern Rhine, leaving only the Swabian militia at the Kehl-Strasbourg crossing, and a minor force commanded by Karl Aloys zu Fürstenberg at Rastatt. In addition, a small force of about 5,000 French royalists under the command of the Louis Joseph, Prince of Condé, supposedly covering the Rhine from Switzerland to Freiburg im Breisgau. Once Charles committed his main army to the mid and northern Rhine, however, Moreau executed an about face, and a forced march with most his army and arrived at Strasburg before Charles realized the French had even left Speyer. To accomplish this march rapidly, Moreau left his artillery behind; infantry and cavalry move more swiftly. On 20 June, his troops assaulted the forward posts between Strasbourg and the river, overwhelming the pickets there; the militia withdrew to Kehl, leaving behind their cannons, which solved part of Moreau's artillery problem.

At Hüningen, near Basel, on the same day that Moreau's advance guard crossed at Kehl, Pierre Marie Barthélemy Ferino executed a full crossing, and advanced unopposed east along the German shore of the Rhine, with the 16th and 50th Demi-brigades, the 68th, 50th and 68th line infantry, and six squadrons of cavalry that included the 3rd and 7th Hussars and the 10th Dragoons. (Note: The French Army designated two kinds of infantry: d'infanterie légère, or light infantry, to provide skirmishing cover for the troops that followed, principally d'infanterie de ligne, which fought in tight formations.) This gave the French the desired pincer effect, with the Army of the Sambre and Meuse approaching from the north, the bulk of the Army of the Rhine and Moselle crossing in the center, and Ferino crossing in the south.

Within a day, Moreau had four divisions across the river, representing a fundamental success of the French plan, and they executed their plan with alacrity. From the south, Ferino pursued Fröhlich and the Condé in a wide sweep east-north-east toward Villingen while Gouvion Saint-Cyr chased the Kreistruppen into Rastatt. Latour and Sztáray tried to hold the line of the river Murg. The French employed 19,000 foot soldiers and 1,500 horsemen in the divisions of Alexandre Camille Taponier and François Antoine Louis Bourcier. The Austrian brought 6,000 men into action under the command of Karl Aloys zu Fürstenberg and Johann Mészáros von Szoboszló. The French captured 200 Austrians and three field pieces.

=== Battle ===
On 5 July 1796, Desaix approached Latour at the Rastat.t

=== Impact ===
By turning both Latour's flanks, Desaix drove his Imperial and Habsburg combined force back to the river Alb. The Habsburg and Imperial armies did not have enough troops to hold off the Army of the Rhine and Moselle and would need reinforcements from Charles, who was occupied in the north keeping Jourdan pinned down on the west bank of the Rhine.

Recognizing the need for reinforcements, and fearing his army would be flanked by Moreau's surprise crossings at Kehl and Hüningen, Charles arrived near Rastatt with additional troops and prepared to advance against Moreau on 10 July. The French surprised him by attacking first, on 9 July. Despite the surprise, in the Battle of Ettlingen, Charles repulsed Desaix's attacks on his right flank, but Saint-Cyr and Taponier gained ground in the hills to the east of the town, and threatened his flank. Moreau lost 2,400 out of 36,000 men while Charles had 2,600 hors de combat out of 32,000 troops. Anxious about the security of his supply lines, though, Charles began a measured and careful retreat to the east.

== Orders of Battle ==
=== French ===
Commander Louis Desaix

- Division Commander Antoine Guillaume Delmas

- Brigade: Maurice Frimont

- 16th Demi-brigade Infantry de légère (three battalions) (Note: The French Army designated two kinds of infantry: d'infanterie légère, or light infantry, to provide skirmishing cover for the troops that followed, principally d’infanterie de ligne, which fought in tight formations. Smith, p. 15.)
- 50th Demi-brigade Infantry de ligne (three battalions)
- 7th Regiment Hussars (four squadrons)

- Division: Michel de Beaupuy

- Brigade Joseph Martin Bruneteau, also known as Sainte-Suzanne

- 10th Demi-brigade Infantry de légère (three battalions)
- 10th Demi-brigade Infantry de ligne (three battalions)
- 4th Regiment Chasseurs à cheval (four squadrons)
- 8th Regiment Chasseurs à cheval (four squadrons)

- Division: Charles Antoine Xaintrailles

- Brigade: Jean-Marie Forest

- unknown demi-brigade Infantry de ligne (three battalions)
- 1st Regiment Carabiniers (four squadrons)
- 92nd Regiment Carabiniers (four squadrons)

=== Habsburg/Coalition ===
The Swabian Circle Contingent:

- Infantry Regiments: Württemberg, Baden-Durlach, Fugger, Wolfegg (two battalions each)
- Hohenzollern Royal and Imperial (KürK) Cavalry (four squadrons)
- Württemberg Dragoons (four squadrons)
- two field artillery battalions
