= Battle of Höchst (1795) =

Battle of the War of the First Coalition

Coordinates: 50°5′56″N 8°32′48″E

- Part of War of the First Coalition
Date	11–12 October 1795
Location	Höchst (Frankfurt am Main), Germany
Result	Austrian victory

Belligerents
Republican France	(Habsburg monarchy) Habsburg Austria

Commanders and leaders
(France) J.-B. Jourdan (France) Jean Baptiste Kléber (France) Louis Klein (France) François Lefebvre	(Habsburg monarchy) Count of Clerfayt (Habsburg monarchy) Adam Boros (Habsburg monarchy) Count of Nauendorf (Habsburg monarchy) Karl Joseph Hadik

Units involved
(France) Army of Sambre-et-Meuse	(Habsburg monarchy) Army of the Lower Rhine

Strength
Campaign: 63,615; Höchst: 10,000; Niedernhausen: 5,000	Campaign: Unknown; Höchst: 5,500; Niedernhausen: 8,000

Casualties and losses
Höchst: 500; Niedernhausen: 468, 5 guns Steinbach: Unknown	Höchst: 225; Niedernhausen: Unknown; Steinbach: 92, 3 guns

At the Battle of Höchst (11–12 October 1795), the Habsburg Austrian army commanded by François Sébastien Charles Joseph de Croix, Count of Clerfayt outmaneuvered the French Republican Army of Sambre-et-Meuse commanded by Jean-Baptiste Jourdan. Although the French attacked first, they were unable to dislodge an Austrian flanking column. Afterward Jourdan's army retreated to the north. The clash happened during the War of the First Coalition, part of a wider conflict known as the French Revolutionary Wars. Modern-day Höchst is a suburb and administrative district of Frankfurt am Main in the state of Hesse in Germany. Höchst is about 12 kilometers (7 mi) west of the Frankfurt city center.

In 1795 the French employed two independent armies in thrusts across the Rhine. After winning a bridgehead on the east bank, the northern French army under Jean-Baptiste Jourdan advanced south to the Main River. At this point, the commander of the southern French army, Jean-Charles Pichegru proved uncooperative. This allowed Clerfayt to move the bulk of the Austrian forces against Jourdan. Clerfayt crossed the Main to the east, gaining a dangerously exposed position on the French left flank. After being repulsed at Höchst, the French withdrew northward, eventually abandoning the east bank of the Rhine altogether. The next actions were the Siege of Mannheim, on 19 October, and the Battle of Mainz on 29 October.

== Background ==
In the fall of 1795, the French Directory ordered General of Division Jean-Baptiste Jourdan with the Army of Sambre-et-Meuse and General of Division Jean-Charles Pichegru with the Army of the Rhine and Moselle to launch converging assaults across the Rhine. While Jourdan attacked in the north near Düsseldorf, Pichegru could mount his offensive anywhere in the south between Mannheim and Strasbourg. The operations were designed to catch Feldmarschall Count of Clerfayt's defending Austrian army in a great pincer. Between the two thrusts, the Siege of Mainz dragged on. Several French divisions led by General of Division Jean Baptiste Kléber placed the Fortress of Mainz under blockade on 14 December 1794, but the French lacked the heavy artillery to reduce the city's defenses. In any case, the French were unable to encircle the city since the Austrians held the east bank of the Rhine.

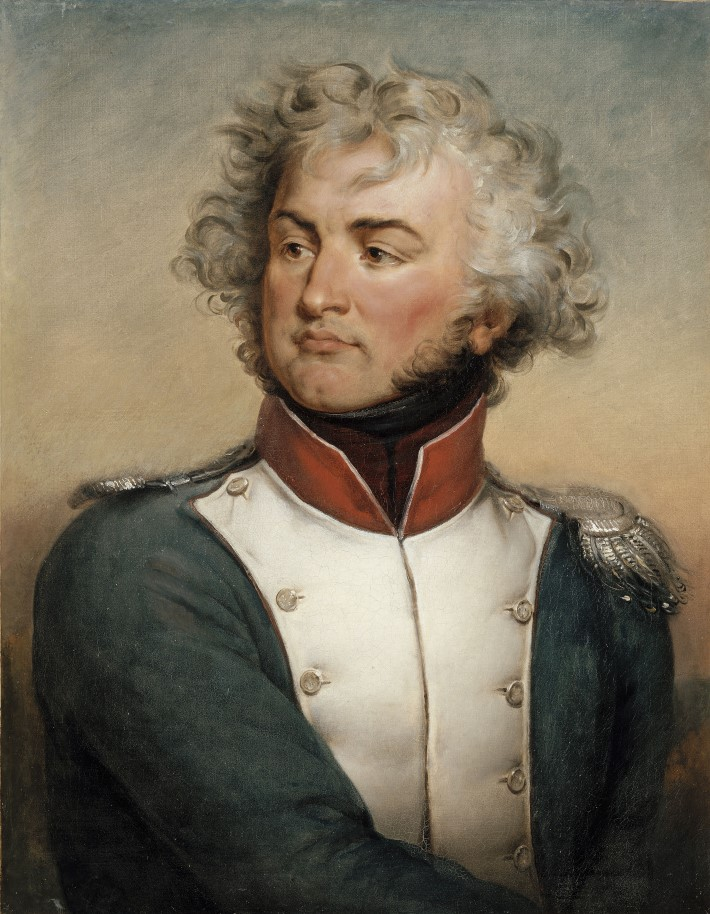
Jean Baptiste Kléber

On 8 September 1795, Jourdan got his army across the Rhine north of Düsseldorf. By the 20th, the Army of Sambre-et-Meuse swept south as far as the Lahn River. Hemmed in by General of Division François Joseph Lefebvre and 12,600 French troops, Count Hompesch surrendered the Bavarian garrison at Düsseldorf on 21 September. After agreeing not to fight the French for one year, the 2,000 Bavarians were permitted to march home, but the city and 168 fortress guns fell into French hands. Threatened by Jourdan's incursion, Clerfayt began shifting his army north to oppose him. This movement gave Pichegru an opportunity. Despite having a 9,200-man Bavarian garrison, Baron von Belderbusch turned over Mannheim and its 471 guns to the Army of Rhin-et-Moselle after negotiations. The Austrians were furious at their ally but could do nothing to prevent their enemies from gaining this valuable bridgehead.

The 1795 campaign marked a change in the relationship between generals at the front and the French government. Since the downfall of the Committee of Public Safety and the end of the Reign of Terror in July 1794, the power of the representatives on mission over army generals had declined. When a representative tried to meddle with a troop deployment in September 1795, Lefebvre brusquely overrode the man's objections.

The fall of Mannheim presented Pichegru with an opportunity to capture Clerfayt's supply base at Heidelberg. This coup might have compelled the Austrian general to retreat. Instead, Pichegru only sent two divisions under Georges Joseph Dufour and Jean-Jacques Ambert to seize the town. When the two French divisions advanced with the Neckar river between them, Austrian Feldmarschall-Leutnant Peter Vitus von Quosdanovich concentrated most of his troops against Dufour's division. On 24 September, Quosdanovich's 8,000 men overcame 12,000 French soldiers when an Austrian cavalry charge led by Johann von Klenau rode down Dufour's division at the Battle of Handschuhsheim. The bloodied French withdrew to Mannheim.

At this point, Pichegru and Jourdan conferred on a plan to push the Austrians out of the region. Jourdan wanted to mass the two French armies near Mannheim, placing them between Clerfayt's army and a second Austrian army under General der Kavallerie Dagobert Sigmund von Wurmser that was advancing from the south. Using the strategy of the central position, Jourdan hoped to defeat the Austrian armies one after the other. Pichegru rejected the plan, and both generals waited upon new orders from Paris. While they were waiting, Clerfayt took his Habsburg army south to block further moves by Pichegru against his Heidelberg base. In response, Jourdan ordered his army to move south to the Main River. This move completely isolated Mainz by surrounding it from both sides of the Rhine.

== Battle ==
On 1 October 1795, the Army of Sambre-et-Meuse consisted of the divisions of Generals of Division Lefebvre, Jean-Baptiste Bernadotte, Jean Étienne Championnet, Claude-Sylvestre Colaud, Louis Friant, Paul Grenier, Louis-Auguste Juvénal des Ursins d'Harville, François Séverin Marceau-Desgraviers, Antoine Morlot, André Poncet and Jacques Louis François Delaistre de Tilly. However, four divisions were guarding rear areas. Colaud's 8,911 men were posted at Düsseldorf, Friant's 3,296 troops were garrisoning Luxembourg City, Marceau's 11,240 soldiers were besieging the Ehrenbreitstein Fortress near Koblenz and Morlot's 3,471 men were holding Aachen.

Jourdan's 63,615-strong field army was deployed in the following locations. Bernadotte's 8,223 soldiers were at Biberach (Biebrich) watching Kassel (Mainz-Kastel) on the east side of Mainz. Championnet's 9,816 troops were guarding the west side of Mainz. Tilly's 9,861 men were at Herdenheim and Helsheim, which cannot be located on a modern map. The remaining troops were posted on the north bank of the Main. From west to east the defenders were Poncet's 9,384 men between Wickert (Wicker) and Wilbach (Weilbach), Grenier's 11,150 troops at Weilsbach (Weilbach) and Lefebvre's 12,618 soldiers between Selsheim (Zeilsheim) and Niederliederbach (Unterliederbach). Harville's 1,593-strong cavalry reserve was at Marxheim and Langenheim. From Biebrich to Unterliederbach, Jourdan's line ran 31.2 kilometres (19.4 mi).

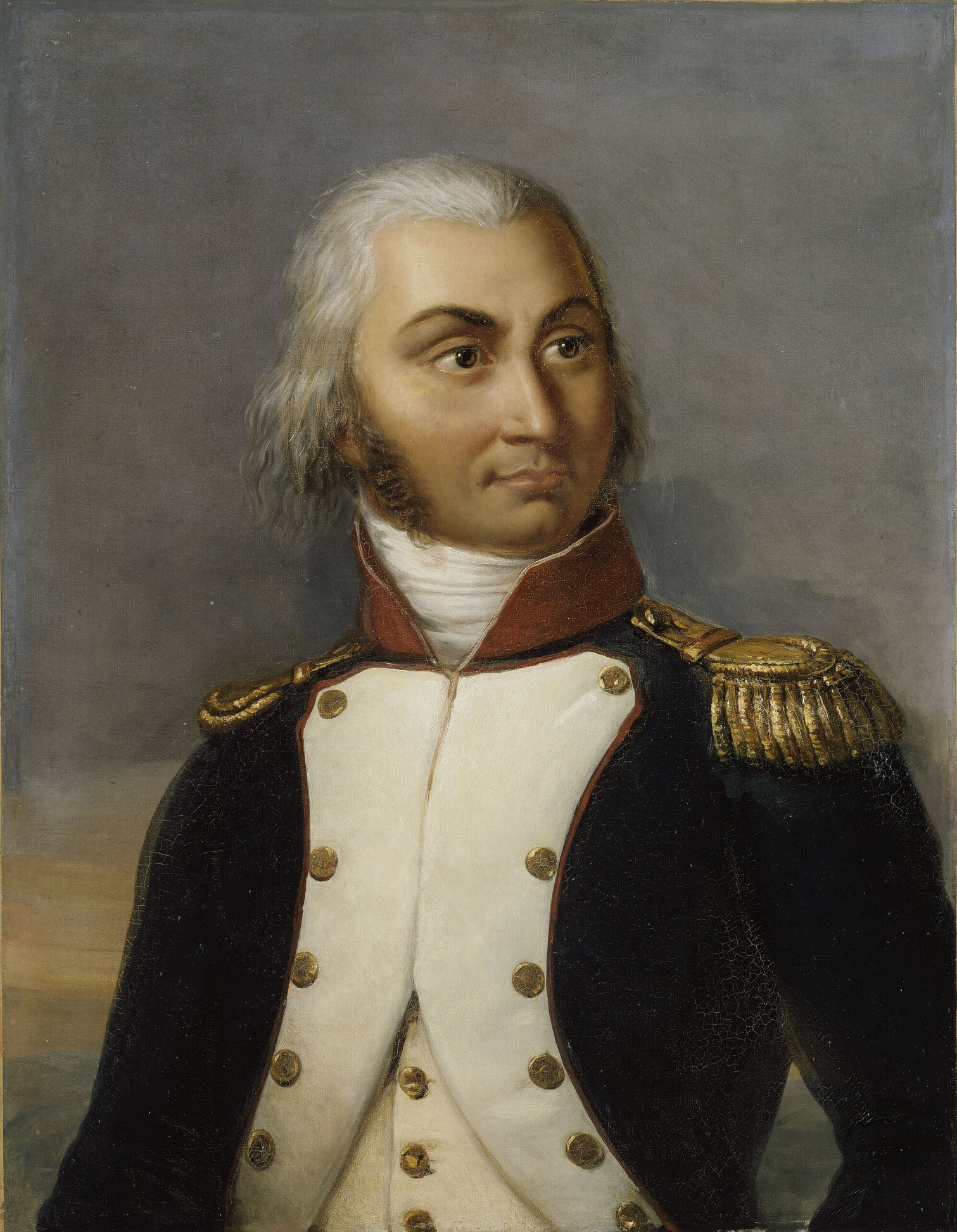
Jean Baptiste Jourdan

The order of battle for Army of Sambre-et-Meuse divisions was as follows. Bernadotte had the 21st Light and 71st, 111th and 123rd Line Demi-Brigades plus the 1st, 6th and 9th Chasseurs à Cheval Regiments in brigades under Generals of Brigade Charles Daurier and Gabriel Barbou. Championnet had the 59th, 132nd and 181st Line Demi-Brigades plus the 1st and 12th Dragoon Regiments in brigades under Generals of Brigade Claude Juste Alexandre Legrand and Louis Klein. Tilly had the 23rd, 27th and 72nd Line Demi-Brigades and the Yonne National Garde plus the 12th Chasseurs à Cheval Regiment in brigades under Generals of Brigade Jean Thomas Guillaume Lorge and Bernard Étienne Marie Duvignau.

Poncet had the 53rd, 87th, 66th and 116th Line Demi-Brigades plus the 7th and 11th Dragoon Regiments in brigades under Generals of Brigade Jean Joseph Schlachter and Nicolas Soult. Grenier had the 110th, 173rd, 112th and 172nd Line Demi-Brigades plus the 19th Chasseurs à Cheval and 4th Hussar Regiments in brigades under Generals of Brigade Henri Simon, Jean Baptiste Olivier and Christophe Oswald. Lefebvre had the 10th and 13th Light and the 8th, 90th and 119th Line Demi-Brigades plus the 1st, 6th and 9th Chasseurs à Cheval Regiments in brigades under Generals of Brigade Jean François Leval, Jean-Baptiste Jacopin and Jean-Joseph Ange d'Hautpoul. The demi brigades usually consisted of three battalions each. Harville led the 6th, 8th, 10th and 13th Cavalry Regiments.

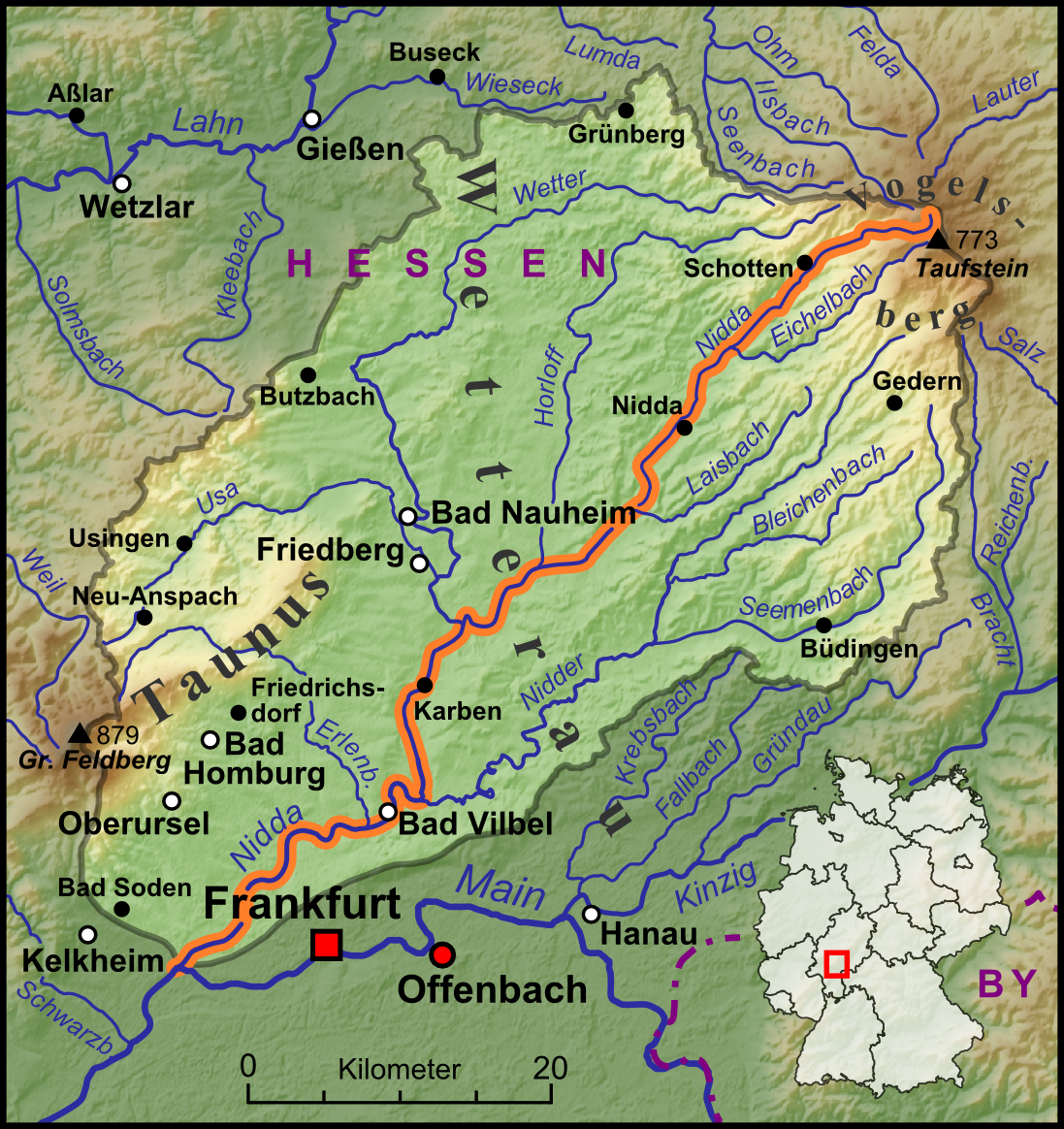
Map of the Nidda River basin

Wurmser's army arrived in the theater and by 10 October 1795 it approached Mannheim. With no pressure from Pichegru, Clerfayt had a chance to deal with Jourdan alone. He moved his army northeast from Heppenheim to Aschaffenburg, another suburb of Frankfurt. Turning to the northwest, the Austrian army reached Offenbach am Main on 10 October. By modern roads, this route is 93.7 kilometres (58 mi). Ignoring Frankfurt's neutrality, Clerfayt's troops crossed the Main, circled around the east side of the city and advanced west along the south bank of the Nidda River.

On 11 and 12 October 1795, 10,000 French troops commanded by Kléber tried to overpower an Austrian force defending the line of the Nidda near its confluence with the Main. The 5,500 defenders, commanded by General-major Adam Boros de Rákos, consisted of one battalion of the Jordis Infantry Regiment Nr. 59, two battalions and four squadrons of the Wurmser Freikorps, six companies of the Warasdiner Grenz infantry (border infantry), three companies of the Grün-Laudon Freikorps, two companies of Tyrolean sharpshooters and two squadrons of the Waldeck Dragoon Regiment Nr. 39. Despite persistent French assaults, Boros' men held their ground and inflicted losses of 500 killed and wounded on their opponents. The Austrians lost 24 killed and 201 wounded. The French division involved was either Bernadotte's or Championnet's.

Jourdan convened a council of war and a decision was made to retreat back across the Rhine. On 13 October at Niedernhausen in the Taunus hills the Austrians attacked the 5,000-man French rear guard in a severe clash. Generals of Brigade Klein and Charles Joseph Boyé led six infantry battalions, three cavalry regiments and three artillery pieces. They faced a total of 8,000 Austrians in Boros' command plus General-major Friedrich Joseph, Count of Nauendorf's Observazionkorps. Nauendorf's troops included two unidentified infantry battalions, four squadrons of Blankenstein Hussar Regiment Nr. 16, two squadrons of Würzburg Dragoon Regiment and two squadrons of Bercsény Hussars, a royalist French Émigré unit. The Republican French force dispersed with the loss of 334 killed and wounded, 134 missing, five guns and 111 wagons, including 80 carrying ammunition. Austrian losses are unknown.

Two days later, the French got the better of another rear guard action at Steinbach. A portion of Clerfayt's Observazionkorps under General-major Karl Joseph Hadik von Futak was driven off by the rearguard of Lefebvre's division. The Austrians suffered losses of 92 casualties and three field pieces captured. French losses are not known. Rather than mount an aggressive pursuit, Clerfayt held the bulk of his army behind the Nidda for five days after the battle on the 11th. The French left wing retreated to Düsseldorf, the center to Bonn, and the right wing to Neuwied. The withdrawal of the right was interrupted when the Neuwied bridge burned on 19 October. By this time, Clerfayt decided to throw his weight against the French forces at Mainz.

== Results ==
The French withdrawal forced Marceau to lift the siege of Ehrenbreitstein on 17 October 1795. Marceau had under his command the 9th Light and 1st, 21st, 26th and 178th Line Demi-Brigades, the 31st Gendsarme Battalion and the 11th Chasseurs à Cheval Regiment. His brigades were led by Generals of Brigade Gilbert Jacques Naleche and Jean Hardy. The 2,600-man Ehrenbreitstein garrison included one infantry battalion and two Jager companies from the Archbishopric of Trier, one battalion of the Austrian Murray Infantry Regiment Nr. 55, gunners and sappers. Few casualties were suffered on either side. The fortess commander was Oberstleutnant (lieutenant colonel) Johann Sechter who was promoted to Oberst (colonel) on 6 November 1795.

By 20 October, the Army of Sambre-et-Meuse was back on the west bank of the Rhine, with its center around Koblenz. By this time Wurmser had begun the French-occupied Mannheim. With the two French armies widely separated, the French at Mainz were unsupported. Clerfayt launched a powerful attack on the French lines and won the Battle of Mainz on 29 October. Turning south against Pichegru, the Austrian commander defeated the French at the Battle of Pfeddersheim on 10 November and Frankenthal on 14 November, isolating Mannheim. The Austrians successfully wrapped up the Siege of Mannheim on 22 November.

The poor showing of the French was likely caused by the treachery of Pichegru, who had expensive tastes and greater ambitions. The general accepted money from a British agent and was in contact with persons who wished for a return to the French monarchy. Despite reason for suspicion, he remained in command of the Army of Rhin-et-Moselle until March 1796, when he resigned. He returned to Paris where he was popular. His replacement in army command was General of Division Jean Victor Marie Moreau.
