= Victor Levasseur =

- Born: 7 March 1772; Caen, France
- Died: 13 September 1811 (aged 39) Valognes, Manche, France
- Allegiance: France
- Branch: Infantry
- Service years: 1792–1811
- Rank: General of Brigade
- Conflicts: War of the First Coalition; Siege of Mainz; Battle of Rastatt; Siege of Kehl; War of the Second Coalition; Battle of Hohenlinden; War of the Third Coalition; Battle of Austerlitz; War of the Fourth Coalition; Battle of Jena; Battle of Eylau
- Awards: Légion d'Honneur, CC 1804; Baron of the Empire, 1808

General of Brigade Victor Gabriel Levasseur, 1st Baron Levasseur (7 March 1772 in Caen – 13 September 1811 in Valognes) commanded a French infantry brigade in the Grande Armée of Emperor Napoleon I.

Leaving civilian life, he enlisted in a volunteer battalion in 1792 and was wounded at the 1793 Siege of Mainz. In the Rhine Campaign of 1796 he fought at Rastatt and Kehl. Promoted general of brigade in 1800, he fought at Hohenlinden. Under Napoleon he commanded a brigade in the IV Corps at Austerlitz in 1805, Battle of Jena in 1806 and Eylau in 1807, where he was wounded. He became a Baron of the Empire in 1808, commanded posts in the interior and served as a military instructor. He died in 1811 at Valognes.

== Career ==
On 16 May 1800, Levasseur was made General (Brigadier) of the 2nd brigade of the 4th Corps of the Grand Army (Commanded by Marshal Soult).

Levasseur distinguished himself in battle at Iéna and his brigade participated in the encirclement and the decisive breakthrough at Austerlitz which saw the battle turn in Napoleon's favour.

Levasseur was wounded at the Battle of Eylau in 1807 and was made a Chevalier de la Légion d'honneur.
