= Jean-Jacques Ambert =

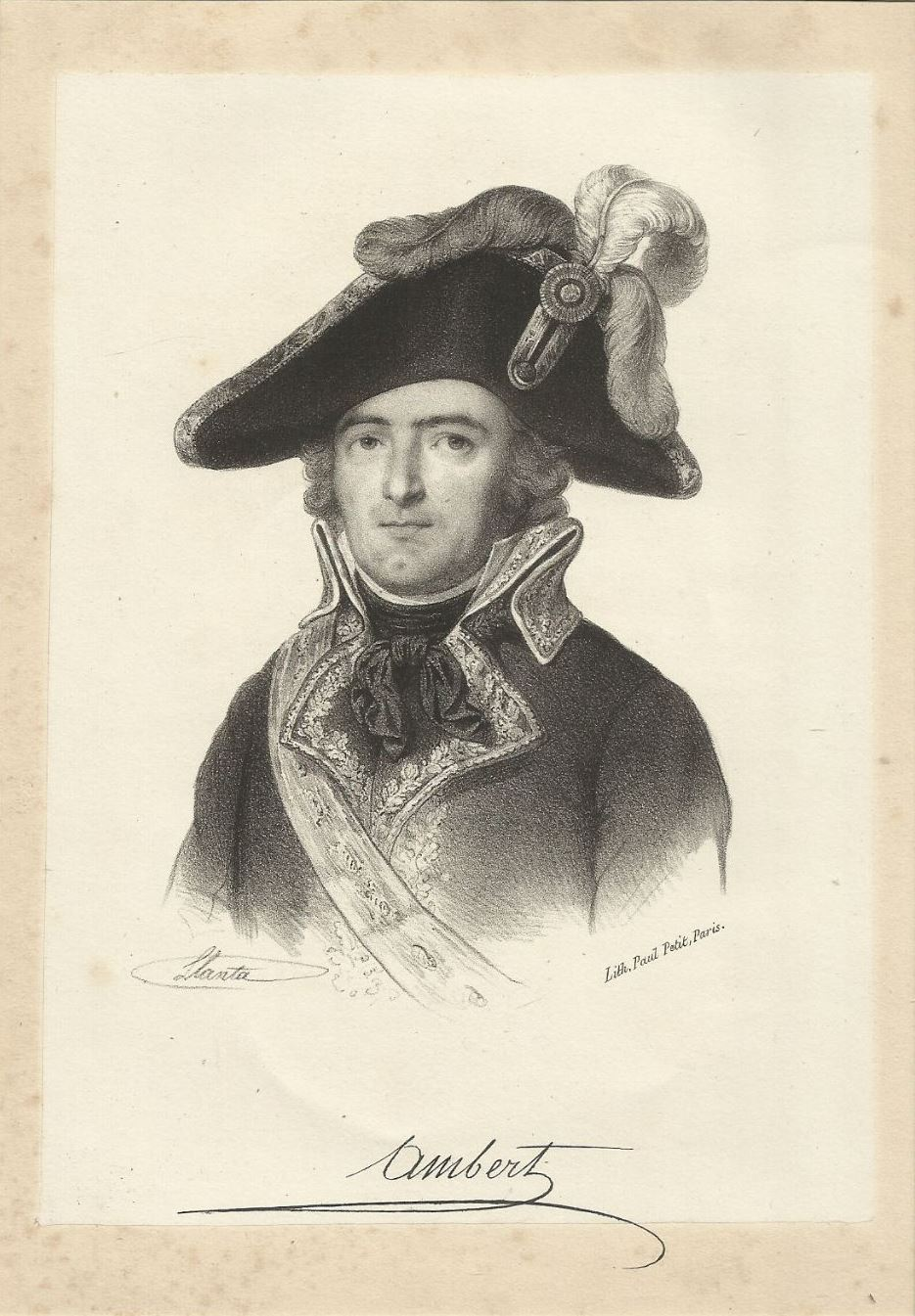
- Jean Jacques Ambert
- Born: 30 September 1765; Saint-Céré, France
- Died: 20 November 1851 (aged 86); Basse-Terre, Guadeloupe, France
- Military career
- Allegiance: France
- Branch: Infantry
- Service years: 1780–1815
- Rank: General of Division
- Conflicts: American Revolutionary War; Battle of Martinique; Invasion of Tobago; Battle of the Chesapeake; Battle of the Saintes; War of the First Coalition; Battle of Kaiserslautern; Battle of Kaiserlautern; Siege of Luxembourg; Battle of Handschuhsheim; Siege of Mannheim; Siege of Kehl
- Awards: Légion d'Honneur, 1814; Order of Saint Louis
- Other work: Baron of the Empire, 1813

Jean-Jacques Ambert (French: [ʒɑ̃ ʒak ɑ̃bɛʁ]; 30 September 1765 – 20 November 1851) commanded a French division in several engagements during the French Revolutionary Wars. He embarked on a French ship of the line during the American Revolutionary War and saw several actions. At the start of the French Revolutionary Wars, he commanded a battalion and thereafter enjoyed a fast promotion. He led a division in action at Kaiserslautern in 1793, Kaiserslautern in 1794, Luxembourg, Handschusheim, and Mannheim in 1795, and Kehl in 1796. His career later suffered an eclipse because of his association with two French army commanders suspected of treason. He spent much of the Napoleonic Wars commanding a Caribbean island, clearing his name, and filling interior posts. His surname is one of the names inscribed under the Arc de Triomphe.

== Early career ==
Ambert was born on 30 September 1765 at Saint-Céré in what later became the department of Lot. His parents were Jacques Ambert and Marianne Rouchon. In 1780 he shipped as a volunteer aboard the Pluton (74) during the American Revolutionary War. During that conflict, he participated in the Battle of Martinique during the attempted recapture of Saint Lucia in 1780 and in the successful Invasion of Tobago in May and June 1781. The Pluton was also engaged at the Battle of the Chesapeake on 5 September 1781. Later, the ship was part of Admiral Louis-Philippe de Vaudreuil's squadron which fought at the Battle of the Saintes in April 1782. The Pluton survived that defeat because it called at Portsmouth, New Hampshire on 10 October 1782. Ambert returned to France in 1783.

== French Revolution ==
At the beginning of the War of the First Coalition, Ambert became chef de bataillon (major) of the 2nd Battalion of Lot. He earned rapid promotion. On 22 September 1793, he was named general of brigade and on 12 November 1793 he was elevated to the rank of general of division. He led a division in Lazare Hoche's Army of the Moselle at the Battle of Kaiserslautern on 28 to 30 November 1793. His command included three brigades commanded by Jean Baptiste Olivier, Henri Simon, and Joinville. Altogether, Ambert led one grenadier, six regular, and six volunteer battalions, four regular and four volunteer cavalry squadrons, 14 guns, and a half-company of sappers. Over time, Ambert became friends with several influential generals, including Hoche, Jean Baptiste Kléber, Louis Desaix, Jean-Charles Pichegru, and Jean Victor Marie Moreau.

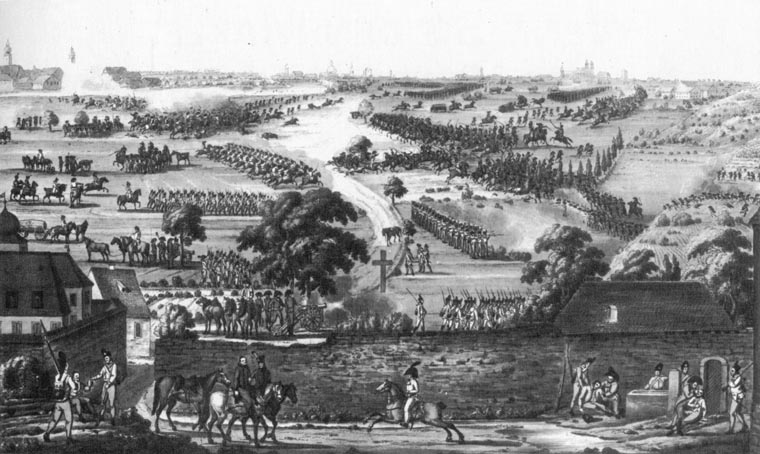
Ambert's division was on the wrong side of the Neckar River when Dufour's division was crushed at the Battle of Handschuhsheim.

Ambert's 5,000-man division was defeated at the second Battle of Kaiserslautern on 23 May 1794. He lost 1,000 men, 17 guns, and two colours, but he was badly outnumbered by an army of 46,000 Prussians. On 21 November 1794, the Army of the Moselle led by Jean René Moreaux began the Siege of Luxembourg. Under Moreaux's command were three divisions under Ambert, Jean-Baptiste Debrun, and Guillaume Péduchelle, a total of 19,800 soldiers. Since the Army of Moselle was discontinued, the force was called the Army before Luxembourg. By 12 December, the three divisions involved in the blockade were led by Ambert, Debrun, and Alexandre Camille Taponier. The Austrian garrison numbered approximately 12,000. On 10 February 1795, Moreaux died of a fever at Thionville and Ambert was directed to assume command of the Army before Luxembourg. At the end of March, three divisions of the Army of Sambre-et-Meuse under Jacques Maurice Hatry replaced the blockading force. At this time Ambert returned to the command of his division in the Army of the Rhine and Moselle.

His 6th Division of Pichegru's Army of the Rhine and Moselle fought at the Battle of Handschuhsheim on 24 September 1795. One of his brigade commanders was Louis-Nicolas Davout. Pichegru sent two divisions to seize the Austrian base at Heidelberg, but they advanced on opposite banks of the Neckar River. During the action, Austrian commander Peter Vitus von Quosdanovich concentrated against and crushed Georges Joseph Dufour's 7th Division on the north bank. A number of Dufour's survivors escaped across a forest to join the 6th Division on the south bank. Ambert saw action on 18 October 1795 at the Battle of Mannheim. The French forces were driven from their camp into the city with losses of 2,000 men and three guns. The Austrians sustained only 709 casualties in the affair.

Ambert married Amable Sophie de Maurès de Malartic (d. 1855) on 18 June 1796. He led the 1st Division in the Siege of Kehl which lasted from 10 November 1796 to 9 January 1797 and ended in an Austrian victory. Ambert's division consisted of two brigades under Davout and Charles Mathieu Isidore Decaen. Davout led the 3rd, 10th, and 31st Line Infantry Demi Brigades while Decaen commanded the 44th and 62nd Line Infantry Demi Brigades. Each demi-brigade comprised three battalions. Kehl was a fortified bridgehead that Moreau constructed on the east bank of the Rhine. In October 1796, the Austrian commander Archduke Charles, Duke of Teschen ordered Maximilian Anton Karl, Count Baillet de Latour to reduce the bridgehead and placed 52 infantry battalions and 46 squadrons of cavalry under his command. After weeks of bitter fighting, the Austrians eventually captured most of the French fortifications. After negotiations, the French evacuated Kehl and retired to the west bank of the Rhine.

== Empire ==
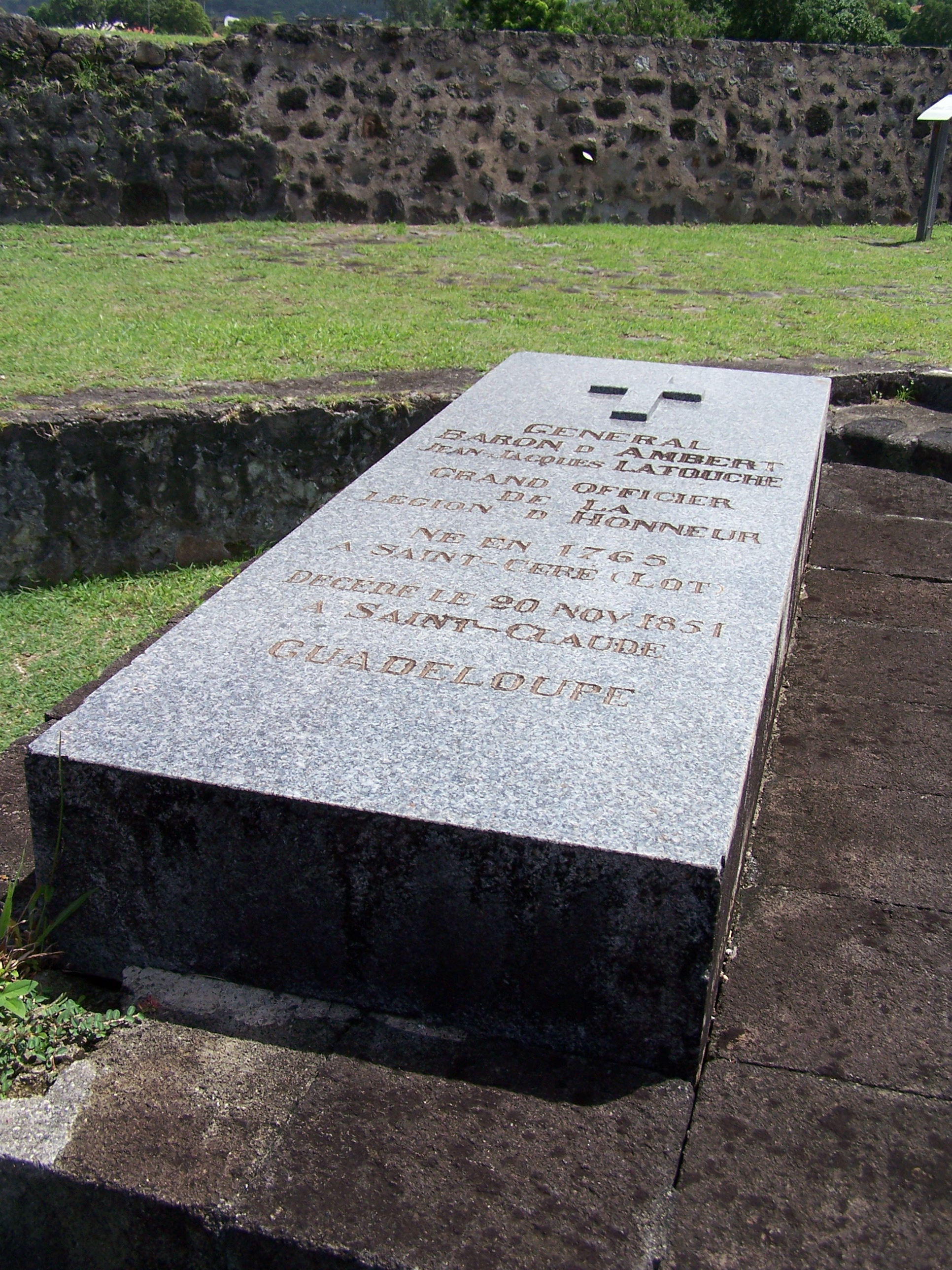
The tomb of Ambert is at Fort Delgrès in Basse-Terre, Guadeloupe

His association with disgraced generals Pichegru and Moreau caused the decline of Ambert's career. He was shipped off to Guadeloupe to be its military governor. In 1808 he was summarily removed from this post when the island was engulfed in civil disorder. He was blamed for standing by and doing nothing to stop the troubles. He made his way back to France and demanded a trial. Cleared of wrongdoing in 1812 by a court martial, he was appointed commander of the 17th Military Division in Holland in 1813. He was named Baron of the Empire on 6 November 1813.

After Napoleon's abdication, Ambert received the Commander's Cross of the Légion d'Honneur on 9 November 1814. He also was decorated with the Order of Saint Louis, probably at this time. In 1815 he held command of the 9th Military Division. When Napoleon landed, Ambert tried to give him advice but was brushed off. Nevertheless, he rallied to Napoleon during the Hundred Days and was asked to defend the line of the Ourcq Canal. He soon retired from the army.

He died on 20 November 1851 on Basse-Terre Island in Guadeloupe. He received the Grand Cross of the Légion d'Honneur on 29 July, a few months before his death. He and his wife had three children. They were Joachim (1804-1890) who married Julie Hopkins (d. 1882), Marie-Anne who married Baron François-Bertrand Dufour (1765-1832), and Jean-Marie-Gustave (1810-1890) who married Catherine Léontine de Lagarde (d. 1900). AMBERT is one of the names inscribed under the Arc de Triomphe, on Column 5.
