= Action at Mannheim (1795) =

Battle of the War of the First Coalition

Coordinates: 49°29′20″N 8°28′9″E

Battle of Mannheim (1795)
- Part of War of the First Coalition
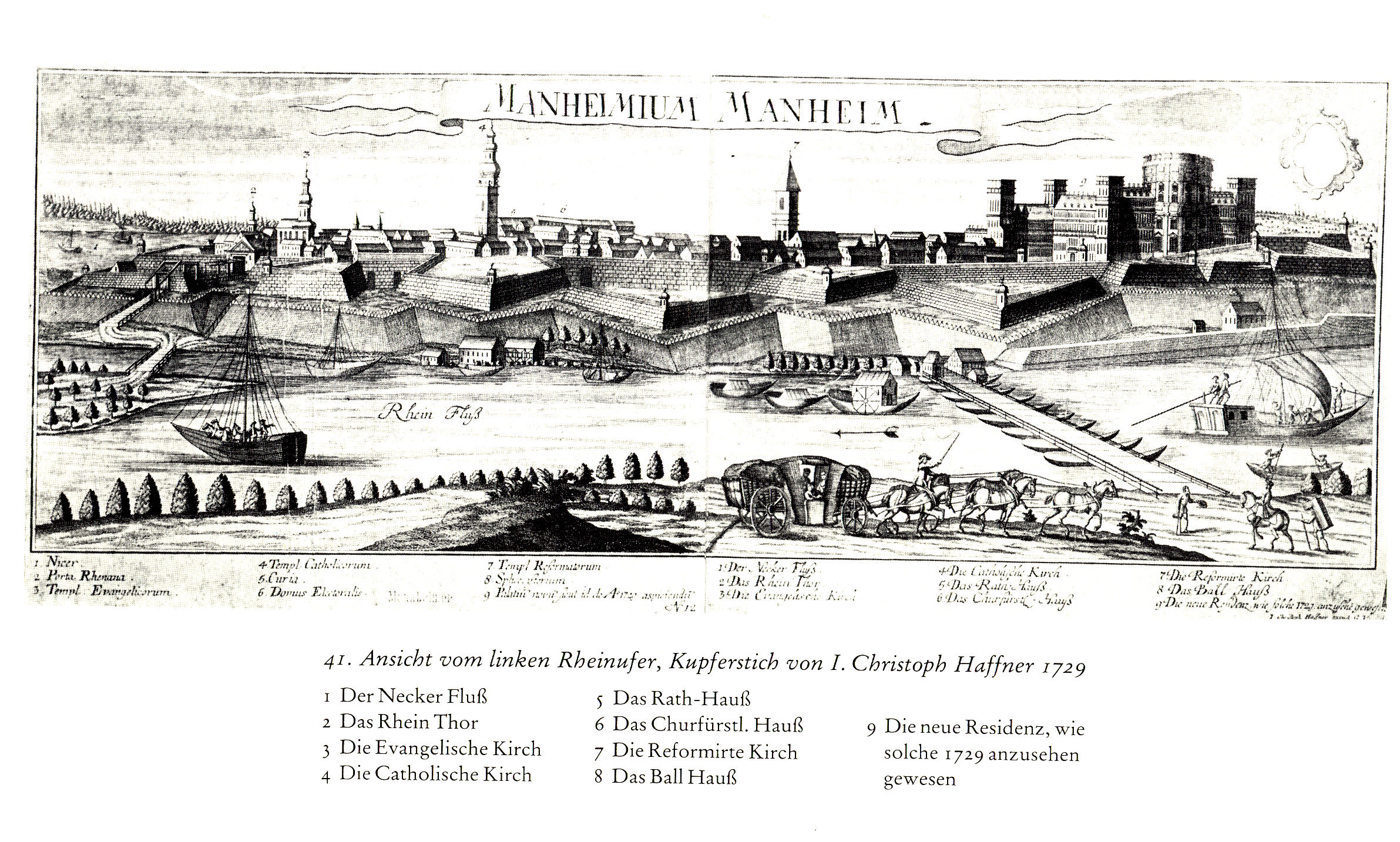
- View of Mannheim in the 18th century
Date	18 October 1795
Location	Mannheim, Electoral Palatinate, modern-day Germany
Result	Austrian victory

Belligerents
(France) French First Republic	(Habsburg monarchy) Habsburg Austria

Commanders and leaders
(France) Jean-Charles Pichegru (France) Charles Montaigu	(Habsburg monarchy) Graf von Wurmser (Habsburg monarchy) Peter Duka von Kadar

Units involved
(France) Army of Rhin-Moselle	(Habsburg monarchy) Army of Upper Rhine

Strength
12,000	17,000

Casualties and losses
2,000, 3 guns	709

The action at Mannheim began in April 1795 when two French armies crossed the Rhine and converged on the confluence of the Main and the Rhine. Initial action at Mannheim resulted in a minor skirmish, but the Bavarian commander negotiated a quick truce with the French and withdrew. On 17 October 1795, 17,000 Habsburg Austrian troops under the command of Dagobert Sigmund von Wurmser engaged 12,000 soldiers, led by Jean-Charles Pichegru in the grounds outside the city of Mannheim. In a combination of maneuvers, the Habsburg army forced 10,000 of the French forces to withdraw into the city itself; other French troops fled to join neighboring Republican armies. First Coalition forces then laid siege to Mannheim. Subsequent action at neighboring cities forced the French to withdraw further westward toward France; after a month's siege, the 10,000-strong Republican French garrison now commanded by Anne Charles Basset Montaigu surrendered to 25,000 Austrians commanded by Wurmser. This surrender brought the 1795 campaign in Germany to an end. The battle and siege occurred during the War of the First Coalition, part of the French Revolutionary Wars. Situated on the Rhine River at its confluence with the Neckar River, Mannheim lies in the federal state of Baden-Württemberg in modern-day Germany.

== Campaign of 1795 ==
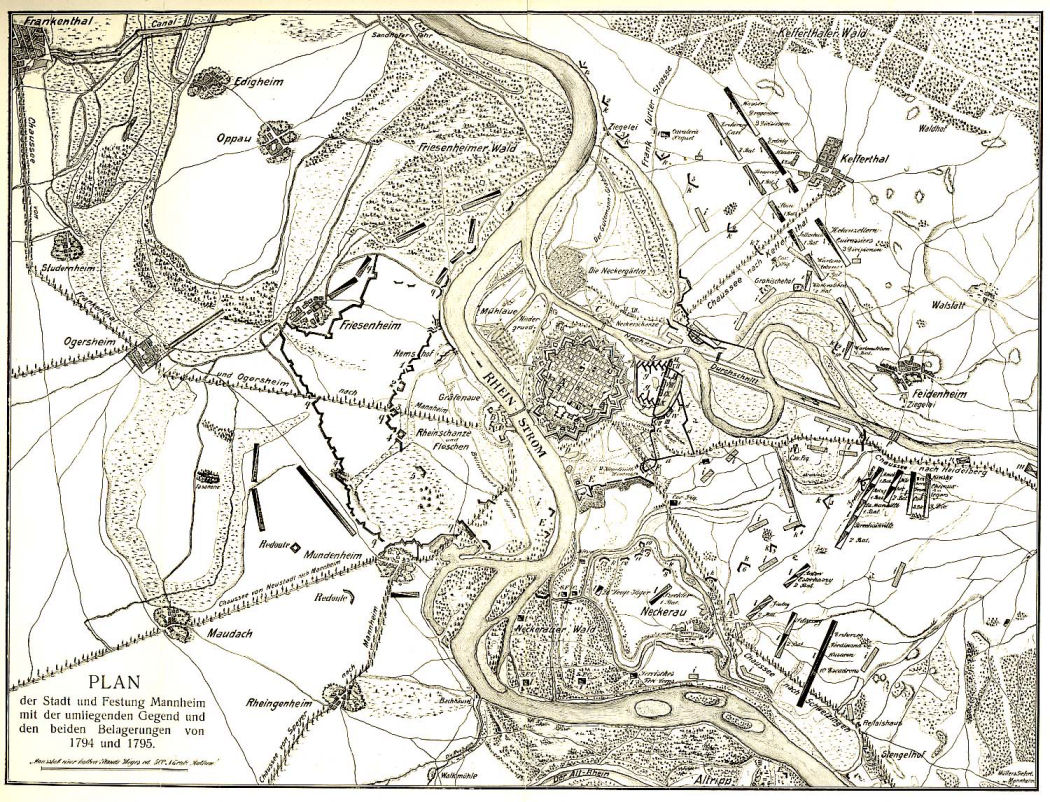
Siege of Mannheim

The Rhine Campaign of 1795 (April 1795 to January 1796) opened when two Habsburg armies under the overall command of François Sébastien Charles Joseph de Croix, Count of Clerfayt, thwarted an attempt by two French armies to cross the Rhine River and capture the Fortress of Mainz. The French Army of the Sambre and Meuse, commanded by Jean-Baptiste Jourdan, confronted Clerfayt's Army of the Lower Rhine in the north, while the French Army of Rhine and Moselle under the command of Pichegru lay opposite Dagobert Sigmund von Wurmser's Army of the Upper Rhine in the south.

In the process of approaching Mainz, however, the French surrounded the small town of Mannheim. Baron von Belderbusch, the commander, entered into negotiations with the French, surrendering Mannheim and its 471 guns on 20 September without resistance. His 9,200-man Bavarian garrison was allowed to march home. The Austrians felt betrayed by their allies, but could only protest as their enemies gained a key bridgehead.

== Summer campaign ==
In the summer of 1795, the French Directory ordered General of Division Jean-Baptiste Jourdan with the Army of Sambre-et-Meuse and General of Division Jean-Charles Pichegru with the Army of Rhin-et-Moselle to launch a pincer attack across the Rhine against Feldmarschall Count of Clerfayt's Austrian army. Jourdan was instructed to cross to the north near Düsseldorf while Pichegru crossed anywhere between Mannheim and Strasbourg in the south. Jourdan's army crossed the Rhine north of Düsseldorf on 8 September. Wheeling to the right, the Army of Sambre-et-Meuse struck south and by 20 September had moved forward to the Lahn River. On the 21st, the Bavarian garrison at Düsseldorf capitulated to General of Division François Joseph Lefebvre and 12,600 French troops. Count Hompesch's 2,000-man garrison was allowed to march home after promising not to fight the French for one year. The city and its 168 fortress guns became French prizes. In the south Pichegru found his army blocked by General der Kavallerie Dagobert Sigmund von Wurmser's Austrian army. Pichegru moved north until he was across from Mannheim and demanded its surrender.

== Battle at Mannheim suburbs ==
In October, Clerfayt massed his troops against Jourdan, beat him at the Battle of Höchst in October, and forced most of the Army of the Sambre and Meuse to retreat to the west bank of the Rhine. With planning made by Peter Duka von Kadar, Wurmser sealed off the French bridgehead at Mannheim, leaving the 12,000 man French forced isolated on the west side of the Rhine. With Jourdan temporarily quiescent, the Austrians defeated the left wing of the Army of the Rhine and Moselle at the Battle of Mainz: 17,000 Coalition troops, commanded by Wurmser, engaged 12,000 Republican French soldiers at Mannheim, commanded by Pichegru. These troops were encamped outside the Mannheim fortress. By sheer weight of numbers, Wurmser drove them from their encampment; 10,000 of them retreated into the city of Mannheim and the rest scattered to join other forces near Mainz and Pfeddersheim.

Siege of Mannheim (1795)
- Part of War of the First Coalition
Date	18 October – 22 November 1795
Location	Mannheim, Electoral Palatinate, modern-day Germany
Result	Austrian victory

Belligerents
(France) French First Republic	(Habsburg monarchy) Habsburg Austria

Commanders and leaders
(France) Jean-Charles Pichegru (France) Charles Montaigu	(Habsburg monarchy) Graf von Wurmser (Habsburg monarchy) Peter Duka von Kadar

Units involved
(France) Army of Rhin-Moselle	(Habsburg monarchy) Army of Upper Rhine

Strength
Siege: 10,000	Battle: Siege: 25,000

Casualties and losses
Battle: Siege: 10,000	Battle: 709; Siege: 400

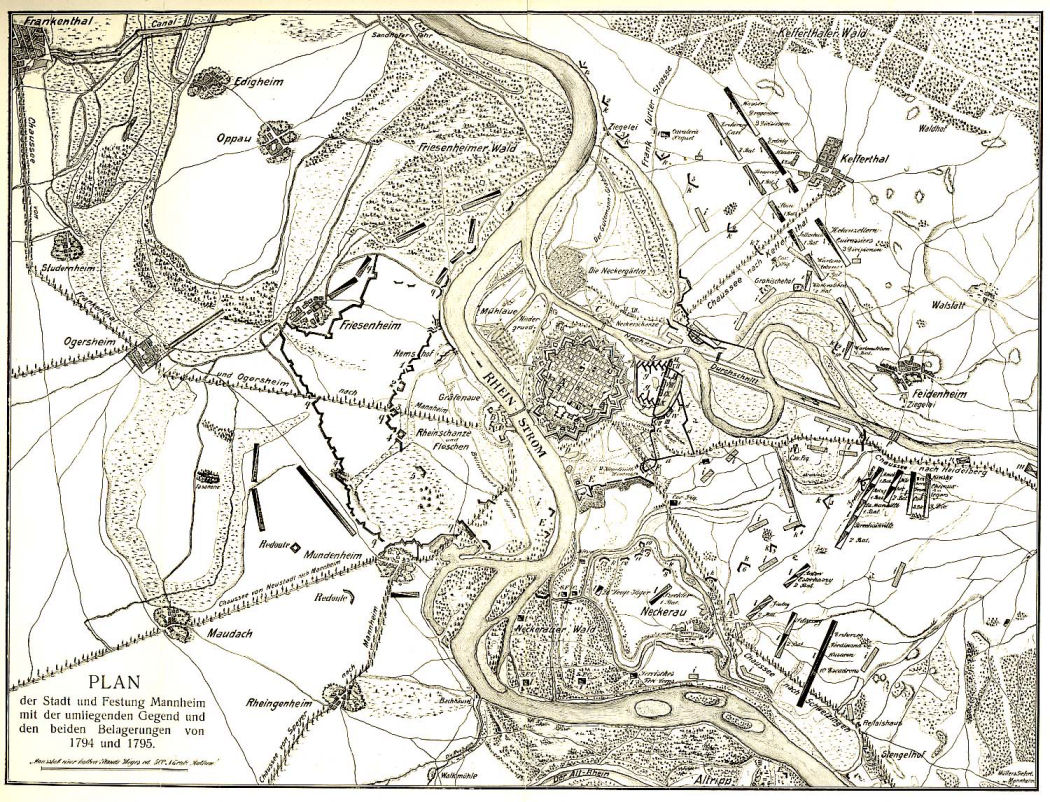
Siege of Mannheim

=== Siege ===
After successfully scattering the French outside of Mannheim, Wurmser then laid siege to the French troops who had sought safety inside the city walls. The siege of Mannheim (18 October – 22 November 1795) began when 17,000 Habsburg Austrian troops under Dagobert Sigmund von Wurmser defeated 12,000 Republican French soldiers led by Jean-Charles Pichegru. In the Battle of Mannheim the French were driven from their camp and forced to retreat into the city of Mannheim which was then placed under siege. After winning battles at Mainz and Pfeddersheim, the Austrian army of François Sébastien Charles Joseph de Croix, Count of Clerfayt drove Pichegru's army away from the city, leaving it isolated. After a month-long siege, the 10,000-strong Republican French garrison of Anne Charles Basset Montaigu surrendered to 25,000 Austrians commanded by Wurmser. This event brought the 1795 campaign in Germany to an end. The battle and siege occurred during the War of the First Coalition, part of the French Revolutionary Wars. Situated on the Rhine River at its confluence with the Neckar River, Mannheim lies in the state of Baden-Württemberg in modern-day Germany. A week later, at Mainz, on 29 October 1795, a Coalition army of 27,000, led by the Count of Clerfayt, launched a surprise assault against four divisions (33,000 men) of the French Army of the Rhine and Moselle directed by François Ignace Schaal. The French division on the farthest right flank fled the battlefield, compelling the other three divisions to retreat with the loss of their siege artillery and many casualties. On 10 November 1795, Clerfayt defeated Pichegru at the Battle of Pfeddersheim. The French continued to withdraw. Clerfayt advanced with 75,000 Coalition troops south along the west bank of the Rhine against Pichegru's 37,000-man strong defenses behind the Pfrimm River near Worms. At the Battle of Frankenthal (13–14 November 1795), an Austrian victory forced Pichegru to abandon his last defensive position north of Mannheim.

After winning battles at Mainz and Pfeddersheim, the Austrian army of François Sébastien Charles Joseph de Croix, Count of Clerfayt drove Pichegru's army away from the city, leaving it isolated. Once the French troops at Pfeddersheim abandoned their position, the French position at Mannheim, invested by the Coalition since October, became untenable. On 22 November 1795, after a one-month siege, the 10,000-strong French siege garrison, commanded by Anne Charles Basset Montaigu, surrendered. This event brought the 1795 campaign in Germany to an end.

== Result ==
The Coalition's successful conclusion of the battle and subsequent siege brought to an end French incursions west of the Rhine in 1795. In January 1796, Clerfayt concluded an armistice with the French. The Austrians retained large portions of the west bank. Despite the armistice, both sides continued to plan for war. In a decree on 6 January 1796, Lazare Carnot, one of the five French directors, again gave Germany priority over Italy as a theater of war. The French First Republic's finances were in poor shape, so its armies would be expected to invade new territories and then live off the conquered lands, as they had been instructed to do in 1795. Knowing that the French planned to invade Germany, on 20 May 1796 the Austrians announced that the truce would end on 31 May, and prepared for invasion.
