= Anne Charles Basset Montaigu =

Anne Charles Basset de Montaigu
- Born: 10 June 1751; Versailles
- Died: 8 May 1821 (aged 69); Lunéville, Meurthe-et-Moselle, Lorraine, France
- Military career
- Allegiance: Kingdom of France; French First Republic; First French Empire
- Branch: Maréchaussée until 1791 reform. Infantry.
- Service years: 1768–1811
- Rank: General of Division
- Conflicts: French Revolutionary Wars; Napoleonic Wars
- Awards: Chevalier, Legion of Honor

Anne Charles Basset de Montaigu, (French pronunciation: [an ʃaʁl basɛ mɔ̃tɛɡy]) born 10 June 1751 in Versailles (Yvelines), died 8 May 1821 at Lunéville (Meurthe-et-Moselle) was a general of the French Revolutionary and Napoleonic wars. Tainted by his association with Charles Pichegru, he was cleared by a courts-martial in 1797, and served subsequently in the Army of the Danube and in the Grande Armée until his retirement from military service in 1811.

== Service ==
Born on 10 June 1751, in Versailles, he entered military service on 6 April 1768, in the Gendarmerie in France, and served there until the reform of this body on 1 April 1788. On 1 September 1791, he was appointed adjutant of the 3rd battalion of volunteers of the Meurthe and on 18 October 1792, he attained the rank of lieutenant colonel, commanding the battalion. On 1 May 1793, he captured two Prussian-occupied villages near Valenciennes. He was promoted to brigadier general on 1 November 1793, by General Jean-Baptiste Jourdan, and confirmed in his rank the following 31 December. On 21 May 1794, he joined the Army of the Sambre and Meuse.

At the Battle of Fleurus he was part of Jean Baptiste Kléber's Army of the North (under temporary leadership of Joseph Souham). His position on the far left flank guarded the Sambre from Thuin to Maubeuge. His division sustained a heavy initial attack by the Prince of Orange; its awkward situation, at right angles to the stream, forced him to initially withdraw toward Courcelles in disorder; a counterattack by Charles Daurier's detached brigade of 6,000 reinforced his own 8,000 men, and the French flank held through the battle, preventing the Coalition force from encircling the French. On 11 July he was given military command of Brussels. Later, as commander of the 8th Division of the Sambre and Meuse army 11 October 1794, he was first dismissed and reinstated a month later under the orders of General Jean-Charles Pichegru, who gave him command of the 3rd Infantry Division on 25 December, and instructed him to cover the military line between Neuss and Nijmegen.

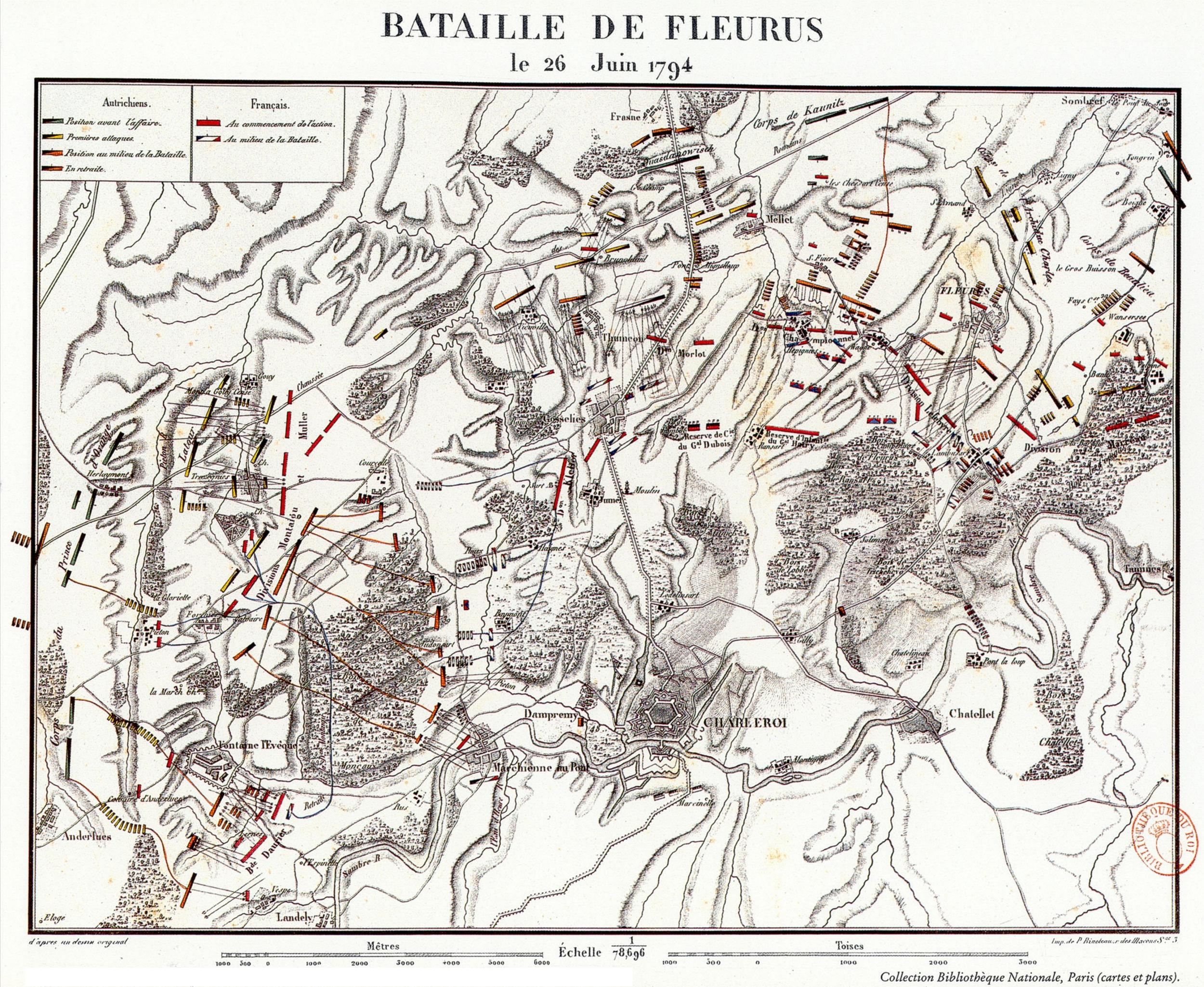
Montaigu guarded the far left flank of the French line.

Consequently, he transferred from the Sambre-et-Meuse, where he was known and respected, to the Army of the Rhine and Moselle, where he was unknown. There, on 24 July 1795, he assumed command of the 6th Division. On 31 October he temporarily took command during the Siege of Mannheim. He was forced to capitulate 21 November 1795, and was taken prisoner by Wurmser. Upon exchange, he returned to France in April 1796 and learned that his conduct in the defense and surrender of Mannheim had been slandered. Montaigu sought to reestablish his reputation and requested a judgement. Gouvion Saint-Cyr defended him, and in his letters (Conjuration), Ernest Daudet also supported him: "he [Montaigu] might be a very good soldier without being fit for the arduous duties of commander of a besieged town." He was acquitted by a courts martial on 25 October 1797. (Note: His association with Pichegru, who some suspected of treason, continued to taint his reputation. Pichegru later told William Wickham, the British envoy, that he had placed the worst possible troops and an unfit commander in Mannheim, which would surely lead to an Austrian victory. Phipps, p. 163.)

He was made Chevalier of the Legion of Honor on 29 March 1805 and retired on 20 June 1811. He died on 8 May 1821 at Luneville.
