= Battle of Mainz =

1795 battle of the French Revolutionary War

Coordinates: 50.0000°N 8.2711°E

- Part of the War of the First Coalition
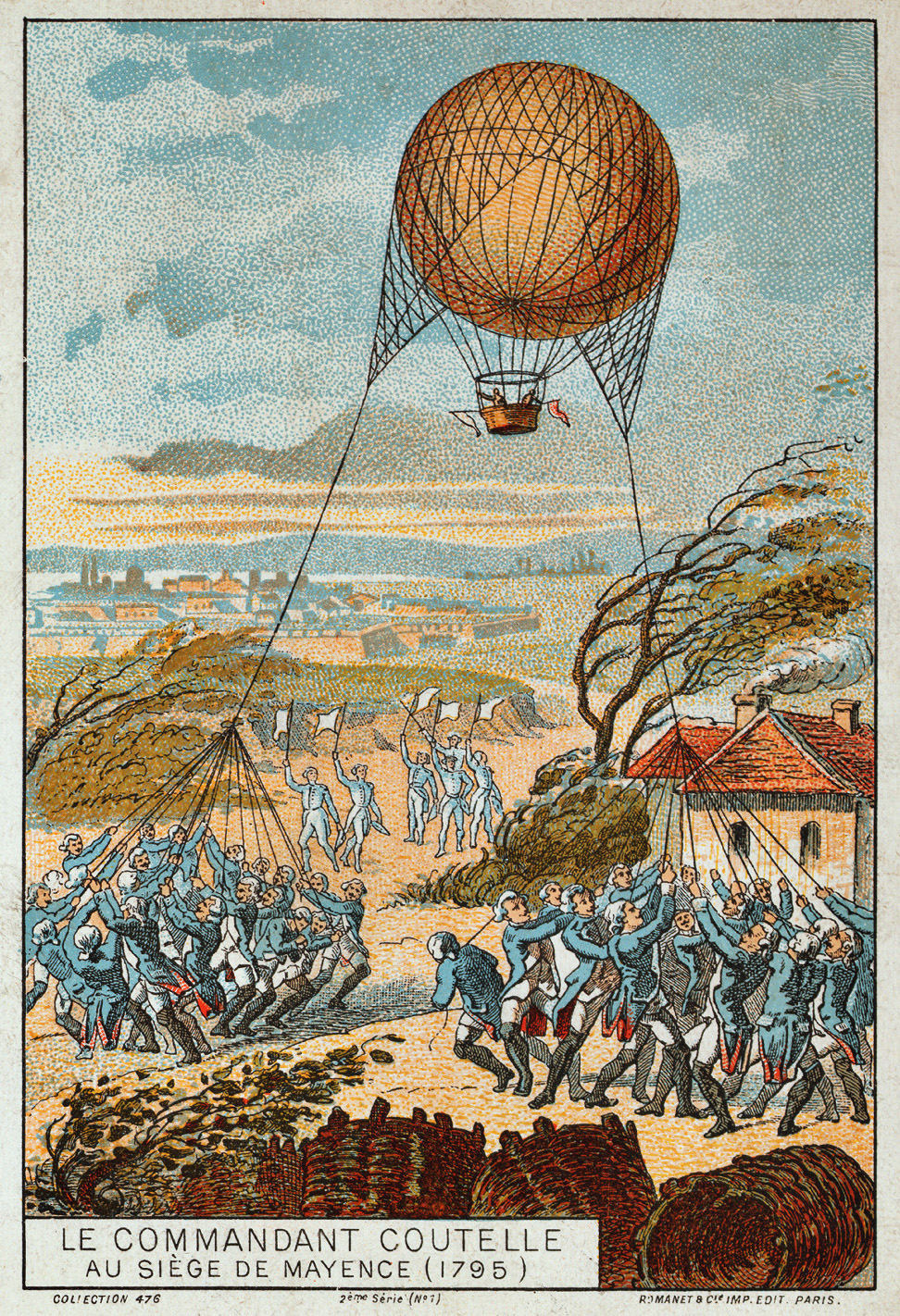
- Reconnaissance during the French siege of Mainz, 1795
Date	29 October 1795
Location	Mainz, present-day Germany
Result	Austrian victory

Belligerents
(France) French First Republic	Habsburg monarchy

Commanders and leaders
(France) François Schaal	(Habsburg monarchy) Count of Clerfayt

Strength
33,000	27,000

Casualties and losses
3,000 killed or wounded 1,800 captured 138 cannons lost	1,400 killed or wounded 200 captured

The Battle of Mainz (29 October 1795) saw a Habsburg Austrian army led by Field Marshal François Sébastien Charles Joseph de Croix, Count of Clerfayt launch a surprise assault against four divisions belonging to the French Army of Rhin-et-Moselle directed by General of Division François Ignace Schaal. The right-most French division was completely routed and all the French troops were compelled to retreat with the loss of their siege artillery and many casualties. Clerfayt followed up his Rhine campaign of 1795 victory by driving most of General of Division Jean-Charles Pichegru's Army of Rhin-et-Moselle south. The War of the First Coalition action was fought near the city of Mainz in the modern-day state of Rhineland-Palatinate in Germany.

French troops had ineffectively besieged the western side of Mainz Fortress since December 1794. However, in early September 1795 the General of Division Jean-Baptiste Jourdan's Army of Sambre-et-Meuse crossed the lower Rhine River and advanced south to the Main River. For the first time Mainz was besieged on the east side of the river, but this state of affairs did not last long. After the Battle of Höchst, Clerfayt forced Jourdan's army to retire to the west bank of the Rhine. With Jourdan temporarily out of the picture, Clerfayt fell on Schaal's somewhat isolated corps and drove it away to the south. During this time the commander of the Army of Rhin-et-Moselle, Pichegru was in treasonous contact with France's enemies, perhaps accounting for Austria's success. The next clash was the Battle of Pfeddersheim on 10 November.

The siege was the second time balloon reconnaissance had been used, after the Battle of Fleurus (1794).

== People involved ==
- François Sebastien Charles Joseph de Croix, Count of Clerfayt
- Jean Baptiste Kléber
- Laurent de Gouvion-Saint-Cyr
- Gabriel Jean Joseph Molitor
- Adam Albert von Neipperg
- Antoine Christophe Merlin
- Auguste de Marmont
- Jean Bernadotte
- Franz von Weyrother
- Franz Joseph, Marquis de Lusignan
- François, marquis de Chasseloup-Laubat
- François Séverin Marceau-Desgraviers
- Jean-Marie-Joseph Coutelle
- Joseph Marie, Count Dessaix
- Nicolas-Jacques Conté
- Paul Louis Courier
- Armée de Mayence
- Serbian mercenaries (see: Kočina Krajina Serb rebellion in 1791) under General Major Stephan Bernhard Keglevich did not take part, but were involved as neutral observers (see map below).
- Frédéric-César de La Harpe did not take part, but was involved, had a leading role in the creation of the Helvetic Republic.

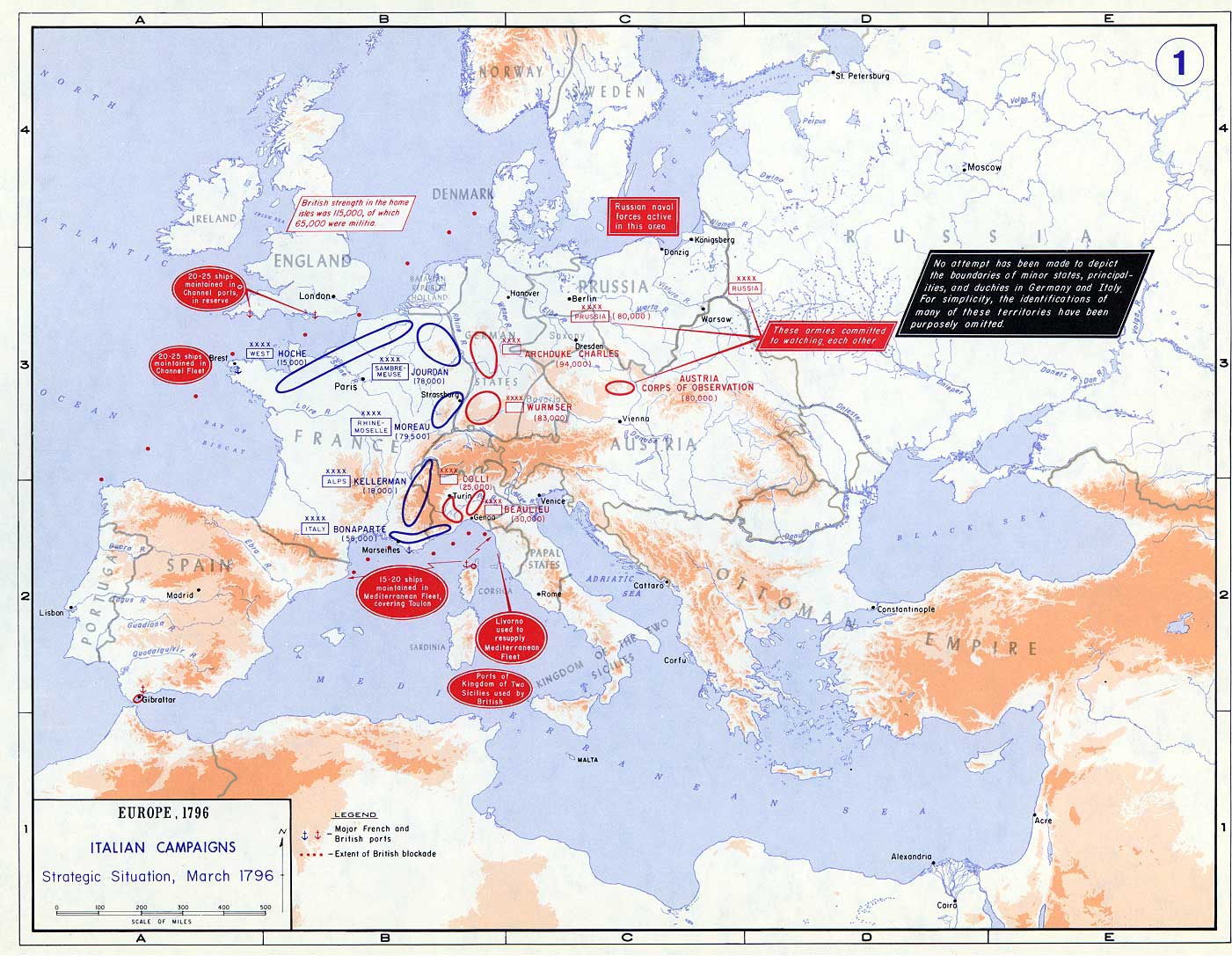
Strategic Situation of Europe 1796

== Military units ==
- 54th Infantry Regiment (France) under Colonel Sauvat(?)
- Hessian (soldiers) under Colonel Johann Keglevich. He was awarded the Military Order of Maria Theresa in 1798 "for by his own initiative undertaken and successfully a campaign significantly affecting feats of arms, which an officer of honor would may have omitted without blame".
