= Georges Joseph Dufour =

Georges Joseph Dufour (French pronunciation: [ʒɔʁʒ ʒozɛf dyfuʁ]; 1758-1820) was a French Republican and military commander during the French Revolutionary and Napoleonic wars.

== Biography ==
Dufour was born at Saint-Seine in France in 1758, and joined the military at Nivernais. He fought at Verdun in 1792, and joined a number of officers refusing to sign the capitulation. He also fought at Battle of Neerwinden, at Namurs, and participated in the suppression of the anti-revolutionary uprising in the Vendée. He was present when the French Army overwhelmed Mannheim in 1795, and was wounded, then captured, by the Austrian Army at the Battle of Handschuhsheim. He continued to fight in the imperial army until 1809. He retired to Bordeaux, but returned to the military during the Hundred Days in 1815. He was detained briefly following Napoleon's final defeat. He died in Bordeaux in 1820.
