= François Sébastien Charles Joseph de Croix, Count of Clerfayt =

Austrian marshal

François Sébastien Charles Joseph de Croix Count of Clerfayt
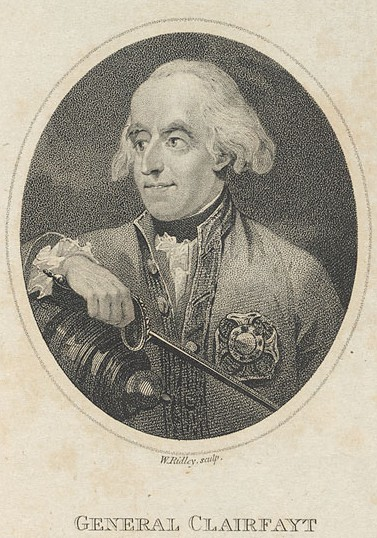
- Born: 14 October 1733; Waudrez, Austrian Netherlands
- Died: 21 July 1798 (aged 64); Vienna, Austria
- Military career
- Allegiance: Habsburg Monarchy
- Service years: 1753 – 1796
- Rank: Field marshal
- Conflicts: See battles: Seven Years' War; Battle of Prague (1757); Battle of Hochkirch; Battle of Liegnitz (1760); Austro-Turkish War; Battle of Mehadia (1789); Battle of Calafat; French Revolutionary Wars; War of the First Coalition; Combat of La Glisuelle; Siege of Longwy; Battle of Jemappes; Battle of Aldenhoven (1793); Battle of Neerwinden; Battle of Caesar's Camp; Siege of Le Quesnoy; Battle of Wattignies; Battle of Tourcoing; Battle of Courtrai; Battle of Aldenhoven (1794); Battle of Sprimont; Battle of Höchst; Battle of Mainz; Battle of Pfeddersheim
- Awards: Grand Cross of the Military Order of Maria Theresa; Knight of the Order of the Golden Fleece

François Sébastien Charles Joseph de Croix, Count of Clerfayt (14 October 1733 – 21 July 1798) was a military commander in the army of the Holy Roman Empire. A Walloon, he joined the army of the Habsburg monarchy and soon fought in the Seven Years' War. Later in his military career, he led Austrian troops in the Austro-Turkish War. During the War of the First Coalition he saw extensive fighting and rose to the rank of field marshal. He is regarded as one of the most capable Austrian commanders of the French Revolutionary Wars.

== Life ==
Clerfayt was born at the Château de Bruille in the town of Waudrez (now a district of Binche), in Hainaut, Austrian Netherlands (now Belgium). He was the son of Marie-Anne Leduc and Sébastien de Croix-Drumez, Count of Clerfayt. His father was a retired lieutenant-colonel who served as governor of Binche. Clerfayt joined the Imperial Army in 1753. He served with distinction in the Seven Years' War, particularly at the battles of Prague (1757), Hochkirch (1758) and Liegnitz (1760). At the conclusion of peace (Treaty of Hubertusburg, 15 February 1763), though still under thirty, Clerfayt had already reached the rank of Oberst (colonel). He was promoted to Generalmajor in 1773 and two years later, in 1775, was appointed Inhaber of Infantry Regiment No. 9 (Walloon), an office he held until his death.

In 1783, Clarfayt was promoted to Feldmarschalleutnant. During the 1787 unrest leading up to the Brabant Revolution, Clerfayt, as an ethnic Walloon, came under great pressure to abandon Emperor Joseph II. But he resisted all overtures, and in the following year went to fight in the Austro-Turkish War with the rank of Feldmarschall-Leutnant. Clerfayt achieved great success in an independent command, defeating the Turks at Mehadia (1789) and Calafat (1790). On 10 November 1788, the emperor appointed him to the rank of Feldzeugmeister, and he was successively awarded the Commander's Cross (1789) and Grand Cross (1790) of the Military Order of Maria Theresa.

=== French Revolutionary Wars ===
Statue by Tomáš Seidan at the Museum of Military History, Vienna

On the outbreak of the War of the First Coalition in April 1792, Clerfayt, as one of the most distinguished of the emperor's generals, was given command of the Austrian contingent in the army of the Duke of Brunswick, which was to march on Paris and crush the French Revolution. On 11 June, Clerfayt's troops inflicted the first defeat on the French Revolutionary Army under General Jean-Baptiste Gouvion at La Glisuelle, then proceeded to capture the fortresses of Longwy on 23 August and Verdun on 2 September. In late September, Clerfayt covered Brunswick's retreat back to the Rhine after the Battle of Valmy.

Clerfayt was then ordered to move north, into Belgium, to join Albert Casimir, Duke of Teschen, the governor of the Austrian Netherlands. He set off on 7 October, reaching Mons on the 31st. Clerfayt commanded the Austrian center at the Battle of Jemappes on 6 November. Following that defeat, the Austrians fell back east to Roermond; Clerfayt took over command when the Duke of Teschen fell ill, and was forced to continue the withdrawal as far as Cologne, as Beaulieu's corps had become cut off from his own and had been forced to retreat to Luxemburg.

In early 1793, Prince Josias of Coburg was appointed supreme commander of Austrian forces in the Low Countries, while Clerfayt retained command of the major part of the line of battle troops. He opened the campaign of 1793 with a victory at Battle of Aldenhoven and the relief of Maastricht, and on 18 March 1793 played a key role in the complete defeat of General Charles Dumouriez at the Battle of Neerwinden. He also led one of the assault columns at the Battle of Caesar's Camp on 7 August, then successfully laid siege to Le Quesnoy from August to September. The Austrians now besieged Maubeuge, the last fortified city between the Coalition armies and Paris. The French rushed an army together under the levée en masse to relieve Maubeuge. On 15 October, General Jean-Baptiste Jourdan led this army against Clerfayt's observation corps at Wattignies; it was easily repelled. The next day, however, Jourdan threw overwhelming forces on the Austrian left wing at the Battle of Wattignies; Clerfayt was forced to retreat to the Sambre, and the siege of Maubeuge was lifted.

In the spring of 1794, Clerfayt commanded the Austrian right wing in Flanders against General Charles Pichegru; he successfully repelled multiple French assaults until his defeat by Pichegru at the Battle of Courtrai on 11 May. Leading a flanking column from the north, he fought at the Battle of Tourcoing on 17–18 May. A French force under Dominique Vandamme slowed his progress until Joseph Souham defeated the Anglo-Austrian army on the southern part of the battlefield. The main Austrian army was decisively defeated on 26 June at the Battle of Fleurus; the Prince of Coburg was dismissed and Clerfayt took over as Austrian commander-in-chief, but the strategic situation was now such that all he could do was to conduct a fighting retreat eastwards to Cologne, and across the Rhine, which he reached on 2 October.

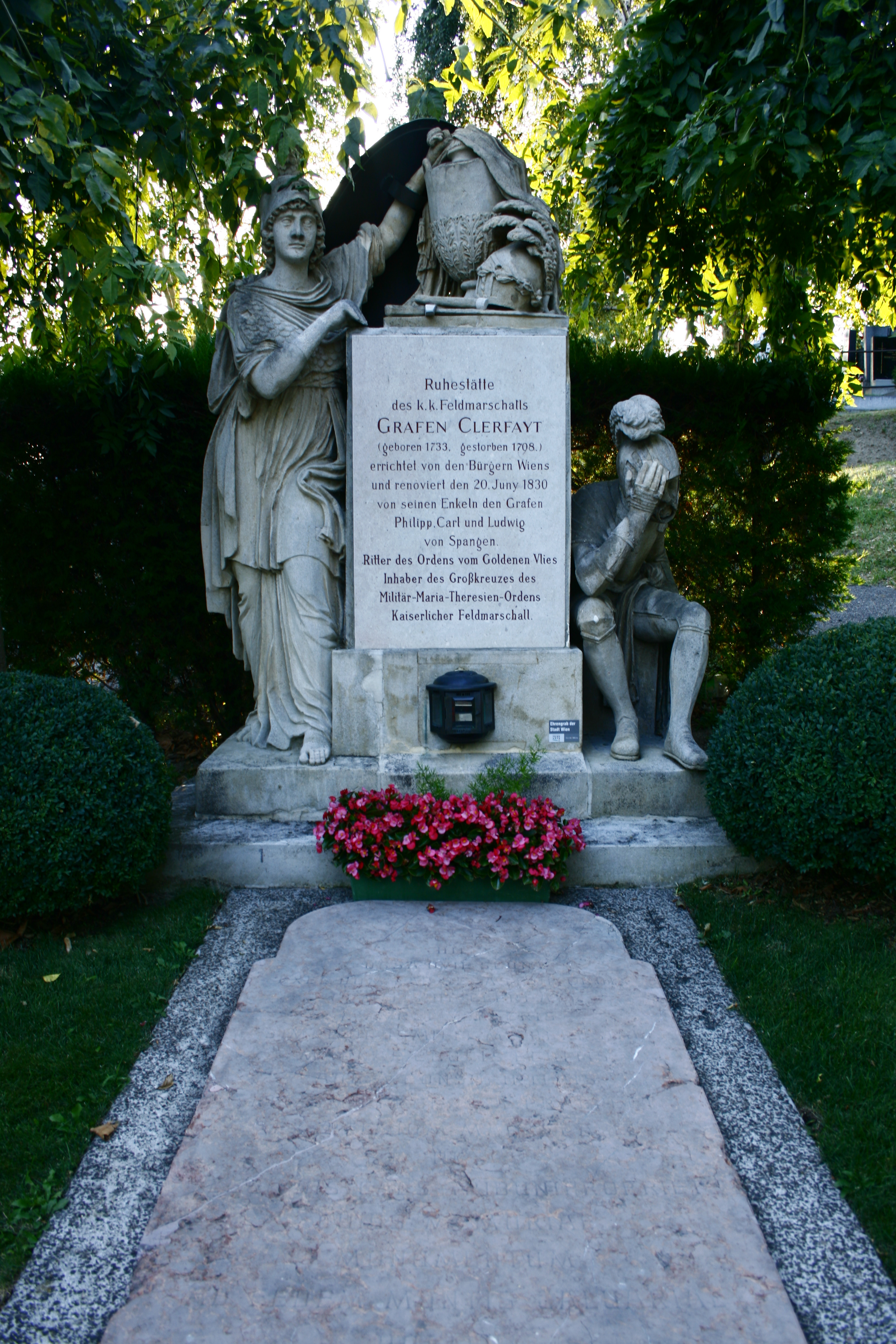
Clerfayt's grave in Vienna's Hernals Cemetery

Together with his promotion to Feldmarschall on 22 April 1795, Clerfayt was appointed commander of the Austrian army on the Middle and Upper Rhine against General Jourdan, and this time the fortunes of war changed. He defeated Jourdan at the Battle of Höchst on 11–12 October and brilliantly relieved Mainz on 29 October. On 21 December, Clerfayt concluded an armistice with the French and returned to Vienna. However, he soon fell out with Foreign Minister Johann Thugut, who did not approve of the armistice and stripped Clerfayt of his command. He then became a member of the Aulic Council in Vienna and was made a knight in the Order of the Golden Fleece. Clerfayt died soon afterwards on 21 July 1798, aged 64. Clerfaytgasse in Hernals, Vienna is named after him.

== Notes ==
1. He was known as French: François Sébastien Charles Joseph de Croix (French pronunciation: [fʁɑ̃swa sebastjɛ̃ ʃaʁl ʒozɛf də kʁwa], while his title was "Count of Clerfayt/Clairfayt (German: Graf von Clerfayt, French: Comte de Clerfayt). The Austro-Hungarian military used the variant German: Franz Sebastian Carl Joseph Clerfayt de Croix. His name could be spelt shorter as Franz Sebastian de Croix.
