= Battle of Pfeddersheim (1795) =

Battle of the War of the First Coalition

Coordinates: 49°39′N 8°17′E

- Part of War of the First Coalition
Date	10 November 1795
Location	Worms-Pfeddersheim, Germany
Result	Austrian victory

Belligerents
Republican France	Habsburg Austria

Commanders and leaders
(France) Charles Pichegru	(Habsburg monarchy) Count of Clerfayt

Units involved
Army of the Rhine and Moselle	Army of the Lower Rhine

Strength
37,232; 36–40 guns	75,000; 150 guns

Casualties and losses
1,400	600

The Battle of Pfeddersheim or Battle of the Pfrimm (10 November 1795) saw a Habsburg Austrian army led by François Sébastien Charles Joseph de Croix, Count of Clerfayt attack a Republican French army under Jean-Charles Pichegru. The Austrians defeated the French and forced them to retreat south to Frankenthal where Clerfayt won another clash a few days later. The battle occurred during the War of the First Coalition, part of the French Revolutionary Wars. The borough of Worms-Pfeddersheim is located in the state of Rhineland-Palatinate in Germany. Worms is approximately 23 kilometres (14 mi) north of Mannheim and Pfeddersheim is about 6 kilometres (4 mi) west of Worms.

In 1795 the French campaign on the Rhine involved two armies operating independently. After a promising start, the first French army under Jean-Baptiste Jourdan was driven back to the west bank of the Rhine. On 29 October the Austrians under Clerfayt routed the French at the Battle of Mainz, forcing them to abandon their siege lines. With Jourdan's army out of the picture, Clerfayt advanced south along the west bank of the Rhine against Pichegru's defenses behind the Pfrimm River near Worms. After beating Pichegru at Pfeddersheim and Frankenthal, Clerfayt isolated the French garrison at Mannheim. Not long afterward, the Austrians successfully wrapped up the Siege of Mannheim, eliminating the French foothold on the east bank of the Rhine and virtually ending the campaign.
