= Fortress of Mainz =

Fortress in Germany

- Festung Mainz
- Mainz
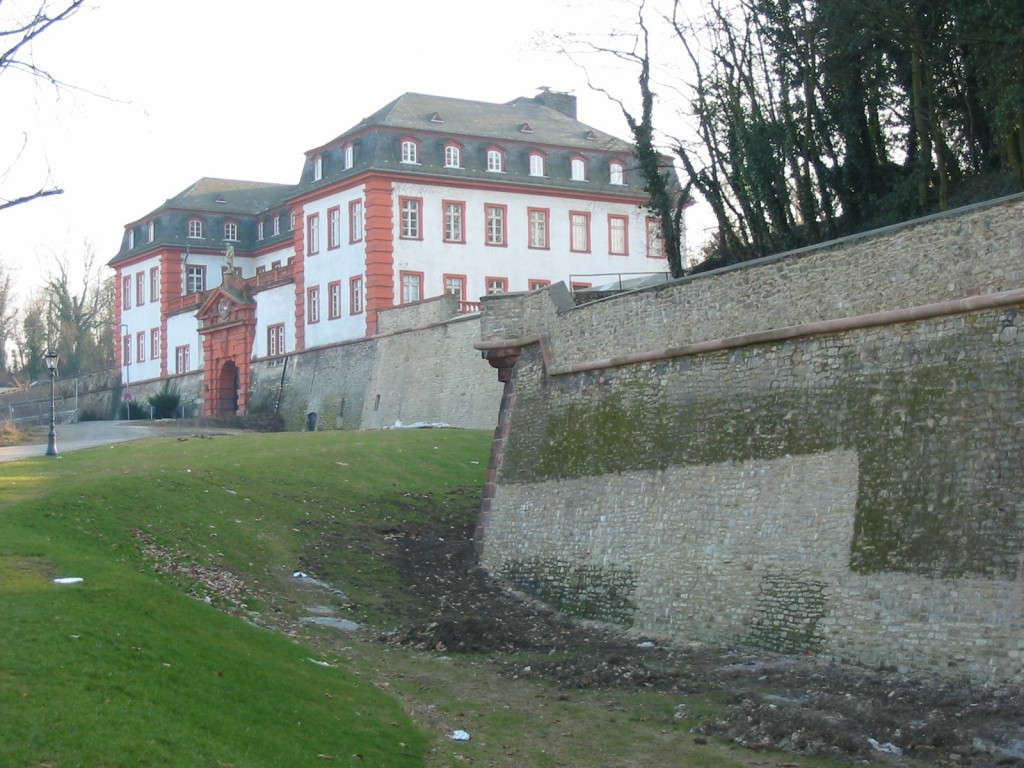

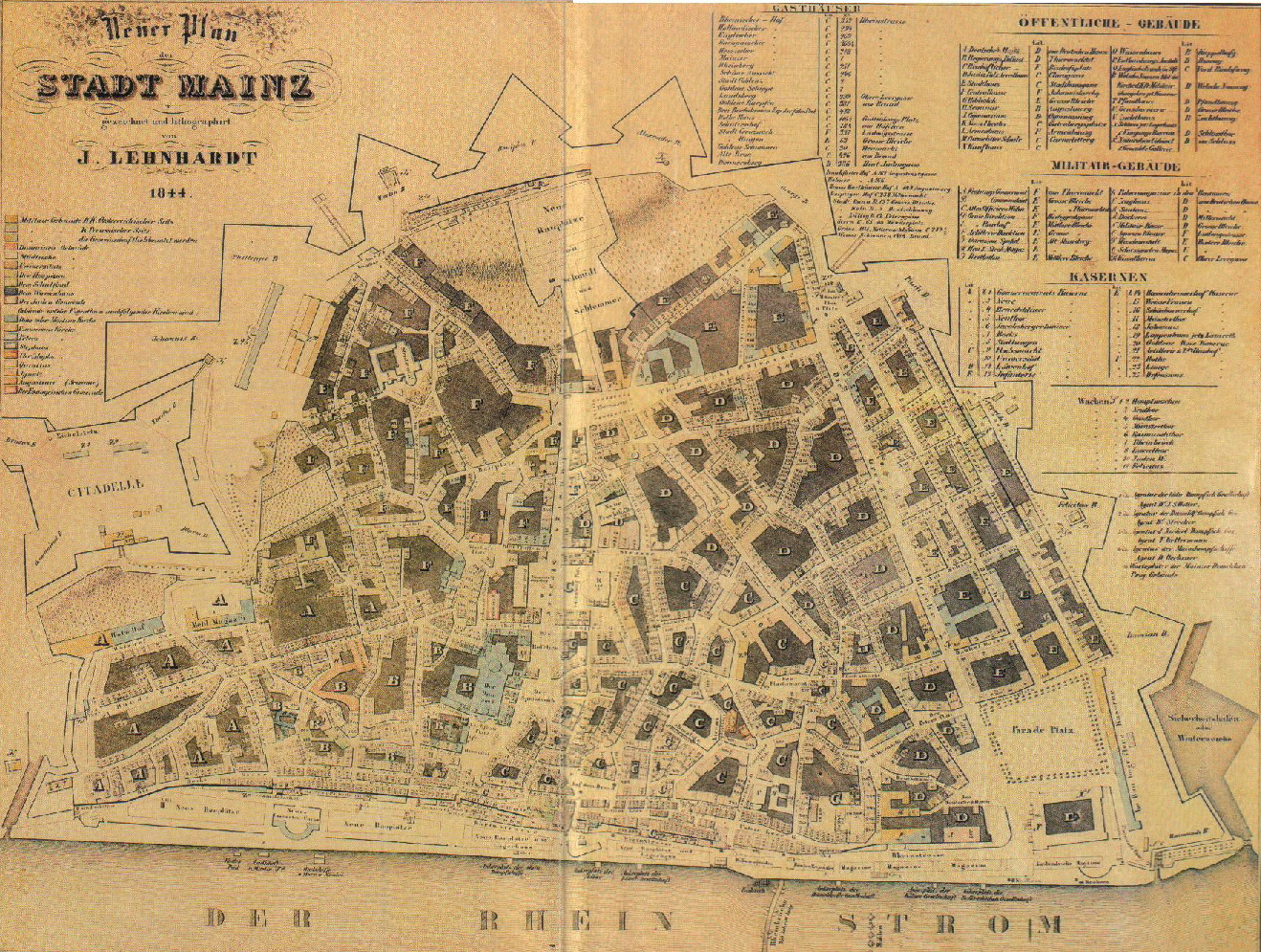

Site information
- Type: Fortress

Location
- Coordinates: 50°0′0″N 8°16′16″E

Site history
- Built: 1619 onwards

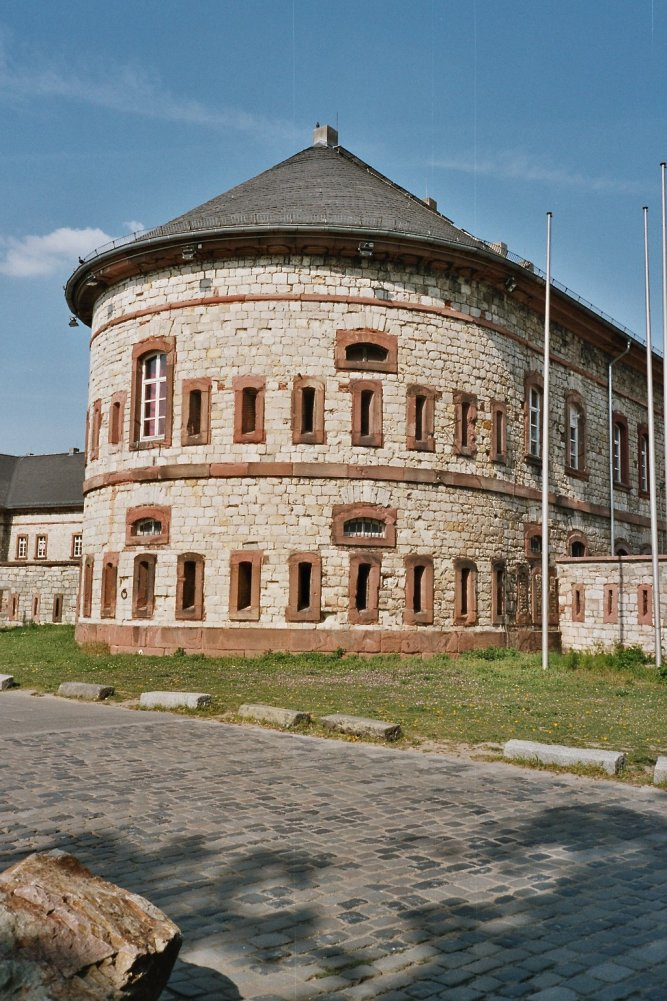
The Reduit of the Fortress of Mainz

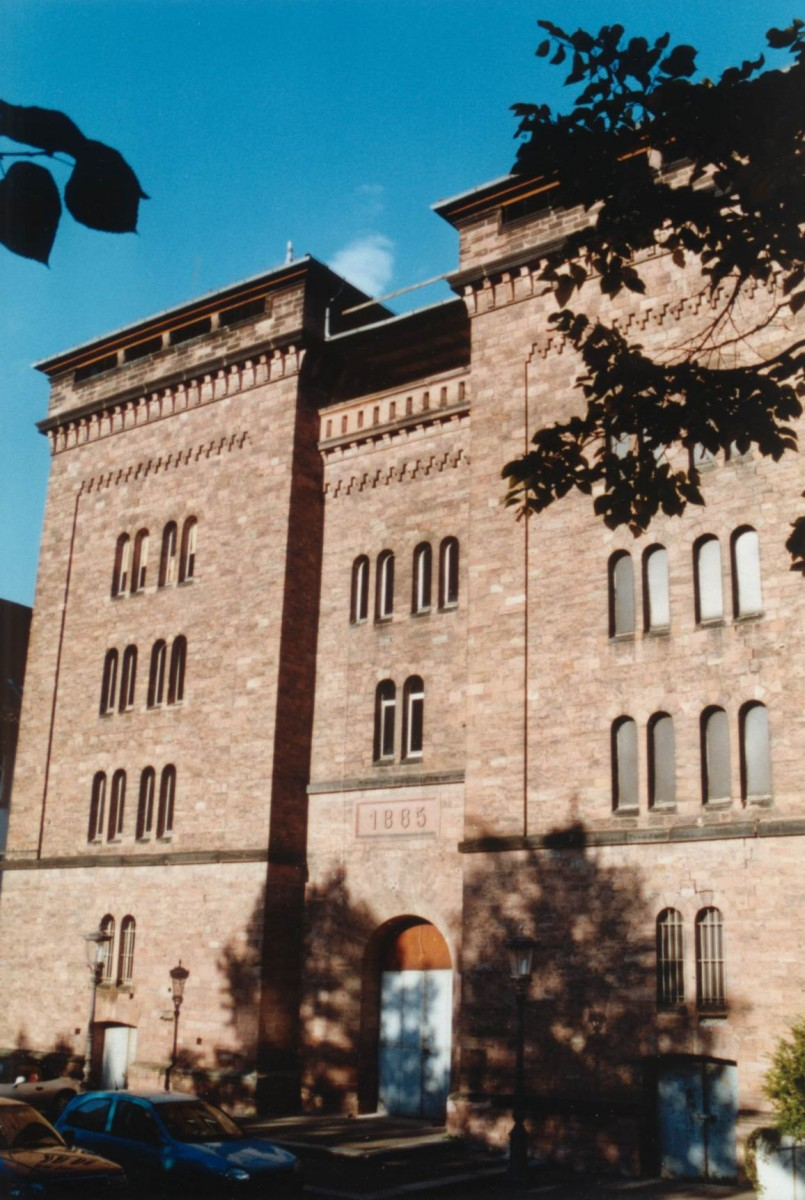
Provisions Magazine of Mainz; on the ground floor with restaurant

The Fortress of Mainz was a fortressed garrison town between 1620 and 1918. At the end of the Napoleonic Wars, under the term of the 1815 Peace of Paris, the control of Mainz passed to the German Confederation and became part of a chain of strategic fortresses which protected the Confederation. With the dissolution of the Confederation and the Austro-Prussian War, control of the fortress first passed to Prussia, and, after the 1871 Unification of Germany, to the German Empire.

== 1839 ==
In 1839 an article on Mainz in The Penny Cyclopædia stated that Mainz was one of the strongest fortresses in Europe, and a chief bulwark of Germany against France. At the Congress of Vienna, Mainz was assigned to the Louis, Grand-Duke of Hesse-Darmstadt, but it was decided that, as a fortress, it should belong to the German Confederation, with a garrison of Austrian, Prussian, and Hessian troops. This garrison in time of peace consisted of 6,000 men. The military governor, who retained his post five years, was alternately an Austrian and a Prussian general. A criticism of the fortress was that it was too large, as it required for its defence a garrison of 30,000 men.

The fortress of Mainz was connected, by a bridge over the Rhine, with the strongly fortified village of Kastel. The extent of the works, which were much enlarged by the French while the city was in their possession, including the work called the Weisenauer Schanze or Fort Weisenau, but exclusive of Kastel and of the small redoubt, was two and a half leagues. Among the principal works were the citadel, with the Eichelstein, and that called the Hauptstein, an extremely strong work projecting beyond all the rest, on an eminence called the Linsenberg. Kastel, which at that time was united with Mainz as an outwork, had very extensive fortifications, which consisted of four strong forts besides the strongly fortified island of Petersau, including which latter the works were of greater extent than even those of Mainz itself. The inner works consisted of 14 principal and 13 smaller bastions. On the land side there were four great gates with double drawbridges, and toward the river several more gates. The Rhine runs from south to north, and the Main from east to west. About a mile above the junction of the two rivers was the village of Kostheim on the Main, and a little farther up a bridge of boats, defended by a strong tête-de-pont.

== 1864 ==
Karl Baedeker writing in 1864 stated that Mainz was amongst the strongest fortresses of the German Confederation. It was surrounded by a threefold line of fortifications: first ring, the chief rampart consisting of 14 bastions comprising the citadel; second ring, a line of advanced forts, connected by glacis; third ring, by still more advanced entrenchments, erected partly by the Prussian, partly by the Austrian engineers, of which the principal were the Weisenauer Lager, the Hartenberg, and the Binger Thurm. On the north side of the town stood a vast Military Hospital, facing the Schlossplatz. In time of peace the garrison consisted of 3,000 Prussian, and a similar number of Austrian troops; in time of war the number of soldiers could be trebled.

== Structures and buildings ==
According to Lehnhardts map of Mainz ~ 1844 many bastions are to be found:

- Bastion Alexander
- Bastion Martin
- Kasematte Bastion Franziskus
- Zitadelle Mainz
- Proviant-Magazin
- Mainz-Kasteler Reduit Kaserne
- Defensionskaserne
- Alexanderkaserne
- Gautor
- Bastion Alexander
- Gonsenheimer Tor
- Rheintore
- Fort Josef
- Fort Weisenau
- Fort Biehler
- Fort Malakoff
- Fort Stahlberg
- Fort Hauptstein [Fort Meunier]
- Fort Hartenberg [Fort Gibraltar]
- Bassenheimer Hof
- Osteiner Hof
- Martinsburg and Electoral Palace
- Old Armory [Nouvel arsenal]
- New Armory [Nouvel arsenal]
- Cavalier Prinz Holstein
- Caponniere at Feldbergplatz
- Rheinschanzen
- Fort Großherzog [Fort Montebello]
- Inundationsschanze [Pont-écluse]
