= Battle of Maudach =

Battle of the War of the First Coalition

Coordinates: 49°27′15″N 8°22′46″E

- Part of War of the First Coalition
Date	15 June 1796
Location	Maudach, Germany
Result	French victory

Belligerents
Republican France	(Habsburg monarchy) Habsburg Austria

Commanders and leaders
(France) Louis Desaix	(Habsburg monarchy) Franz Petrasch

Units involved
(France) Army of Sambre-et-Meuse	(Habsburg monarchy) Army of the Lower Rhine

Strength
27,000 infantry 3,000 cavalry	11,000 infantry and cavalry

Casualties and losses
600	1,800 killed, wounded and missing

The Battle of Maudach occurred on 15 June 1796 between the French Revolutionary Army and the Army of the First Coalition. This was the opening action of the Rhine Campaign of 1796 on the Upper Rhine, slightly north of the town of Kehl. The Coalition, commanded by Franz Petrasch, lost 10 percent of its manpower missing, killed or wounded. It was fought at the village of Maudach, southwest of Ludwigshafen on the Rhine river opposite Mannheim. Maudach lies 10 km (6 mi) northwest of Speyer and today is a southwest suburb of Ludwigshafen; a principal town on the Rhine river in 1796.

== Background ==
Initially, the rulers of Europe viewed the French Revolution as an internal dispute between the French king and his subjects. As revolutionary rhetoric grew more strident, the European monarchs declared that their interests were the same as Louis XVI and his family; the Declaration of Pillnitz (27 August 1791) threatened ambiguous but quite serious, consequences if anything should happen to the royal family. The position of the revolutionaries became increasingly difficult and compounding their problems in international relations, French émigrés continued to agitate for support of a counter-revolution. On 20 April 1792, the French National Convention declared war on Austria, beginning the War of the First Coalition (1792–98). France ranged itself against most of the European states sharing land or water borders, plus Portugal and the Ottoman Empire. Despite some victories in 1792, by early 1793 French forces had been pushed out of Belgium, there was an internal revolt in the Vendée over conscription, widespread public resentment of the Civil Constitution of the Clergy and the French king had just been executed. The armies of the French Republic were in a state of disruption; the problems became even more acute following the introduction of mass conscription, the levée en masse, which saturated an already distressed army with thousands of illiterate, untrained men. For the French, the Rhine Campaign of 1795 proved especially disastrous, although they had achieved some success in other theaters of war (see for example, War of the Pyrenees (1793–95)).

=== 1796 campaign ===
At the end of the Rhine Campaign of 1795, the two sides had called a truce. War preparations continued and in a decree on 6 January 1796, Lazare Carnot gave Germany priority over Italy as a theater of war. Jean-Baptiste Jourdan commanding the Army of Sambre-et-Meuse was instructed to besiege Mainz and cross the Rhine into Franconia. Farther south, Jean Victor Marie Moreau was to lead the Army of Rhin-et-Moselle across the Rhine, besiege or take Mannheim and conduct invasions of the Duchy of Baden, Swabia and the Duchy of Bavaria. Moreau was to converge on Vienna while Jourdan veered south to provide a rear guard. On the secondary front, Napoleon Bonaparte was to invade Italy, neutralize the Kingdom of Sardinia and seize Lombardy from the Austrians. The Italian army would then cross the Alps via the County of Tyrol and join the other French armies in crushing the Austrian forces in southern Germany. By the spring of 1796, Jourdan and Moreau each had 70,000 men while Bonaparte's army numbered 63,000, including reserves and garrisons. François Christophe de Kellermann counted 20,000 troops in the Army of the Alps and there was a small army in southern France. The finances of the French First Republic were so attenuated that its armies were expected to invade new territories and then live off of the conquered lands.

=== Plans for 1796 ===
In Spring 1796, when resumption of war appeared eminent, the 88 members of the Swabian Circle, which included most of the states (ecclesiastical, secular and dynastic) in Upper Swabia, raised a small force of about 7,000 men comprising raw recruits, field hands, and day laborers drafted for service. It was largely guess work where they should be placed and Charles did not like to use the militias in any vital location. In late May and early June, when the French started to mass troops by Mainz as if they would cross there—they even engaged the Imperial force at Altenkirchen (4 June) and Wetzler and Uckerath (15 June)—Charles thought that the main attack would occur there and felt few qualms placing the 7,000-man Swabian militia at the crossing by Kehl.

== Preliminary operations ==
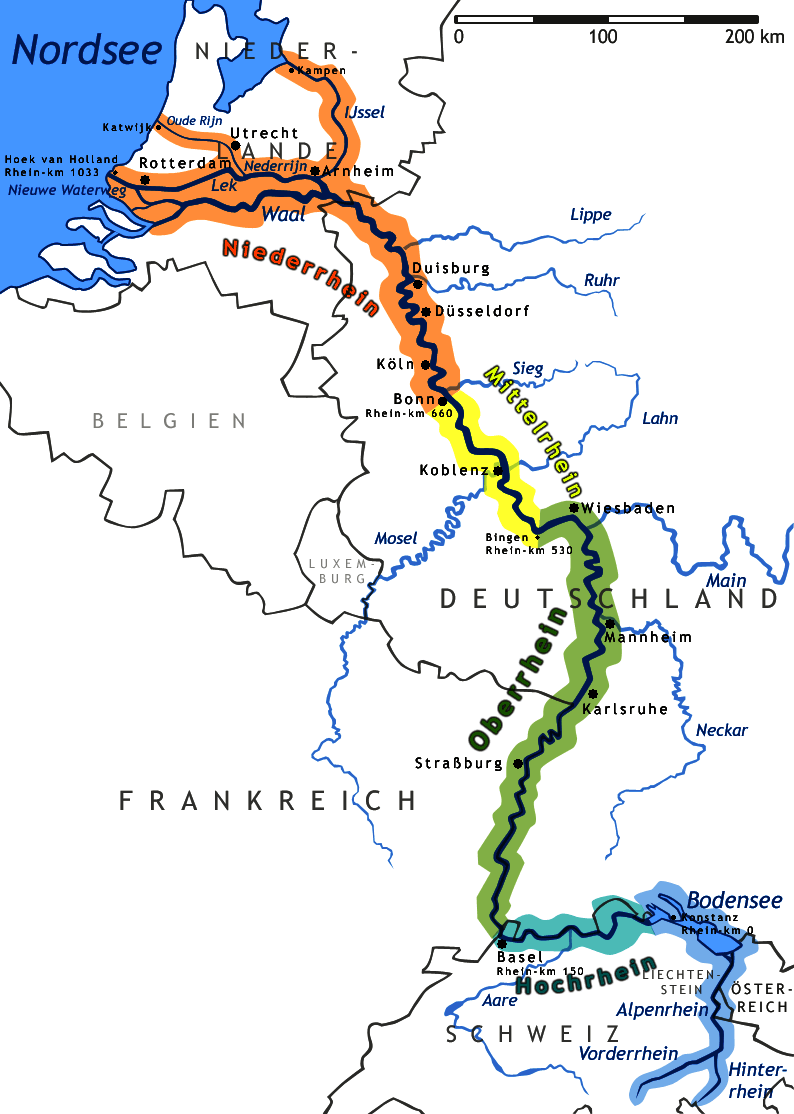
Map of Rhine River shows Düsseldorf and the Sieg and Lahn Rivers in the north and Strasbourg and Mannheim in the south. The colors different sections of the Rhine River: blue is the Alp Rhine and the Lake Rhine (where the river runs through Lake Constance); turquoise indicates the High Rhine (which runs east to west through of Lake Constance); The Upper Rhine (green) begins where the river takes a sharp turn at the Rhine Knee, and flows south to north; yellow designates the Middle Rhine (sometimes called Mittelrhein) and orange designates the Low Rhine, where the Rhine passes into the Netherlands and reaches the North Sea.

Louis Desaix, commanding the left (northern) column of the Army of the Rhine and Moselle, had about 27,000 infantry and 3,000 cavalry when he crossed the Rhine at Maudach. He faced Petrasch's division of about a third of the size, including mixed troops of infantry and dragoons.

While Desaix crossed at Maudauch, Jourdan's main body crossed the Rhine on 10 June at Neuwied to join Kléber and the Army of Sambre-et-Meuse advanced to the Lahn river. In the south, Maximilian Anton Karl, Count Baillet de Latour took command of the Army of the Upper Rhine in place of Wurmser. Leaving 12,000 troops to guard Mannheim, Charles distributeded his remaining troops among his two armies and swiftly moved north against Jourdan. The Archduke defeated the Army of Sambre-et-Meuse at the Battle of Wetzlar on 15 June 1796 and Jourdan lost no time in recrossing the Rhine at Neuwied.

== Battle ==
The action at Maudach was part of a three-pronged feint at the Coalition's defenses in the middle Rhine. On 15 June, Desaix's 30,000-man command mauled Franz Petrasch's 11,000 Austrians at Maudach. The French suffered 600 casualties and the Austrians suffered three times as many. The Austrians clashed with Kléber's divisions at Uckerath, inflicting 3,000 casualties on the French for only 600 casualties. Charles left 35,000 men with Wartensleben, 30,000 more in Mainz and the other fortresses along the Rhine and moved south with 20,000 troops to help Latour across from Speyer and Kléber withdrew within the Düsseldorf defenses. After another feint at the Austrian positions near Mannheim, Moreau sent his army south from Speyer on a forced march toward Strasbourg; Desaix crossed the Rhine at Kehl near Strasbourg on the night of 23–24 June.

== Aftermath ==
On 24 June, at Kehl, Moreau's advance guard of 10,000 men preceded the main force of 27,000 infantry and 3,000 cavalry directed at the Swabian pickets on the bridge. The Swabians were hopelessly outnumbered and could not be reinforced. Most of the Imperial Army of the Rhine was stationed further north, by Mannheim, where the river was easier to cross but too far away to support the smaller force at Kehl. Neither the Condé's troops in Freiburg nor Karl Aloys zu Fürstenberg's force in Rastatt could reach Kehl in time to support them. Within a day, Moreau had four divisions across the river and thrust out of Kehl, the Swabian contingent reformed at Rastatt by 5 July and managed to hold the city until the French turned both flanks. Charles could not move much of his army away from Mannheim or Karlsruhe, where the French had also crossed the river and Fürstenberg could not hold the southern flank. At Hüningen near Basel, on the same day that Moreau's advance guard crossed at Kehl, Ferino executed a full crossing and advanced unopposed eastwards along the German shore of the Rhine with the 16th and 50th Demi-brigades, the 68th, 50th and 68th line infantry and six squadrons of cavalry that included the 3rd and 7th Hussars and the 10th Dragoons.

== Orders of battle ==
=== French ===
Commander Louis Desaix

- Division Commander Antoine Guillaume Delmas

- Brigade: Maurice Frimont

- 16th Demi-brigade Infantry de légère (three battalions) (Note: The French Army designated two kinds of infantry: d'infanterie légère, or light infantry, to provide skirmishing cover for the troops that followed, principally d’infanterie de ligne, which fought in tight formations. Smith, p. 15.)
- 50th Demi-brigade Infantry de ligne (three battalions)
- 7th Regiment Hussars (four squadrons)

- Division: Michel de Beaupuy

- Brigade Joseph Martin Bruneteau, also known as Sainte-Suzanne

- 10th Demi-brigade Infantry de légère (three battalions)
- 10th Demi-brigade Infantry de ligne (three battalions)
- 4th Regiment Chasseurs à cheval (four squadrons)
- 8th Regiment Chasseurs à cheval (four squadrons)

- Division: Charles Antoine Xaintrailles

- Brigade: Jean-Marie Forest

- unknown demi-brigade Infantry de ligne (three battalions)
- 1st Regiment Carabiniers (four squadrons)
- 2nd Regiment Carabiniers (four squadrons)

=== Coalition ===
Coalition Franz Petrasch
- 1 battalion each of:

Infantry Regiment Gemmingen N. 21
Infantry regiment Stain, Nr. 50
Infantry Regiment Erbach, Nr. 42
Infantry Regiment Splenyi Nr. 51
Infantry Regiment Benjowsky, Nr. 31
Infantry Regiment Brechainville Nr. 25

- Six squadrons each of:

Chasseurs Kaiser, Nr. 1
Kinsky Nr. 7
Dragoon Regiment Kaiser Nr. 3
