= General Forrest =

General Forrest may refer to:

- John F. Forrest (1927–1997), U.S. Army lieutenant general
- Nathan Bedford Forrest (1821–1877), Confederate States Army lieutenant general
- Nathan Bedford Forrest III (1905−1943), U.S. Army brigadier general
- William Charles Forrest (1819–1902), British Army general

== See also ==
- Jean-Marie Forest (1752–1799), French Revolutionary brigadier general
