= Xaintrailles (surname) =

Xaintrailles is a surname. Notable people with the surname include:

- Charles Antoine Xaintrailles (1769–1833), French general
- Jean Poton de Xaintrailles (1390?–1461), French noble
