= Army of Germany (1797) =

Army of the Rhine
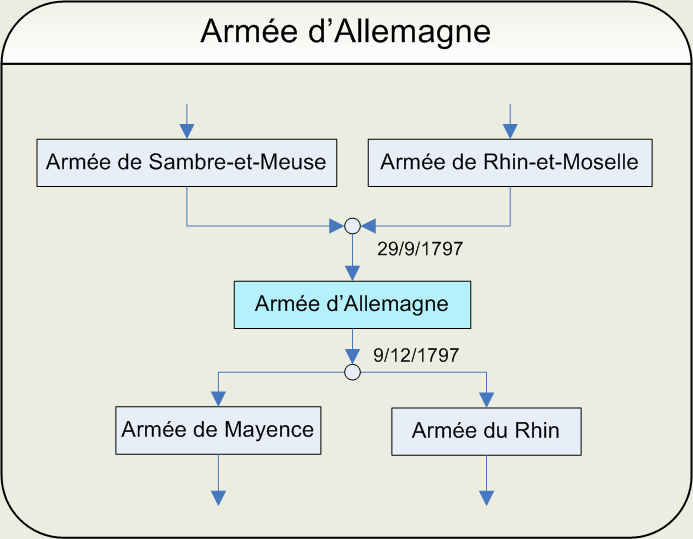
- Origins of the Army of Germany
- Active: 29 September 1797 – 9 December 1797
- Country: France
- Allegiance: First Republic

Commanders
- Notable commanders: Laurent de Gouvion Saint-Cyr

The Army of Germany (Armée d'Allemagne) was one of the French Revolutionary armies, formed by a decree of the French Directory dated 29 September 1797 (8 vendémiaire Year VI) by merging the Army of Sambre-et-Meuse and the Army of the Rhine and Moselle and commanded from the decree until 6 October by général Saint-Cyr under général Hoche. The decree was enacted between 7 and 20 October 1797, and from 7 October until 13 December the unit was under the command of général Augereau and deployed with the armée du Nord. Another decree of 9 December (19 frimaire year VI) that year, executed from 14 to 16 December, re-split this army into the Army of Mainz and Army of the Rhine.

== Campaign ==
The 1797 campaign in the Rhineland concluded in April 1797, after French victories at Neuwied and Diersheim.

As was typical of campaigns in the 1790s, armies typically entered garrisons over the winter months of November–March, reducing numbers of staff and troops, while the generals prepared for fresh campaigns in the spring. Austria signed the Treaty of Campo Formio in October, ceding Belgium to France and recognizing French control of the Rhineland and much of Italy.

== Sources ==
- Hannay, David (1911). "French Revolutionary Wars" . In Chisholm, Hugh (ed.). Encyclopædia Britannica (11th ed.). Cambridge University Press.
- Holland, Arthur William (1911). "French Revolution, The" . In Chisholm, Hugh (ed.). Encyclopædia Britannica (11th ed.). Cambridge University Press.
- C. Clerget: Tableaux des armées françaises pendant les guerres de Révolution (Librairie militaire 1905);
