= Battle of Kehl =

Battle of Kehl may refer to:

- Battle of Kehl (1796)
- Second Battle of Kehl (1796)
