= Battle of Diersheim (1797) =

Battle of the War of the First Coalition

Coordinates: 48°39′N 7°53′E

- Part of War of the First Coalition
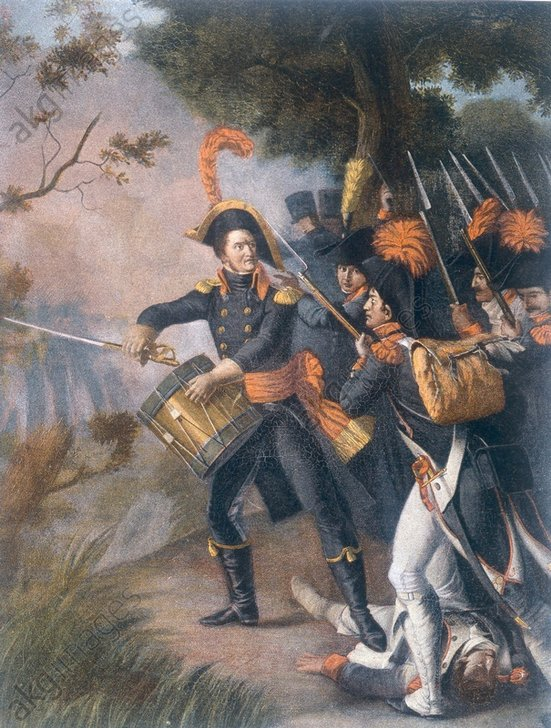
- General Duhesme at the Battle of Diersheim, by Charles Thévenin
Date	20 to 21 April 1797 (2 floréal an V)
Location	Rheinau, present-day Germany
Result	French victory

Belligerents
(France) French First Republic	(Holy Roman Empire) Habsburg monarchy

Commanders and leaders
(France) Jean Moreau	(Holy Roman Empire) Count Anton Sztáray

Units involved
Army of the Rhine and Moselle	Army of the Upper Rhine

Strength
48,500–52,000	24,000–34,000

Casualties and losses
3,000	2,700 killed or wounded 2,000 captured 13 guns

The Battle of Diersheim (20–21 April 1797) saw a French First Republic army led by Jean Victor Marie Moreau clash with a Habsburg army commanded by Anton Count Sztáray de Nagy-Mihaly. Though both sides suffered about 3,000 killed or wounded in the bitter fighting, the Austrians finally retreated with the loss of 2,000 prisoners and 13 artillery pieces. Austrian General Wilhelm von Immens was killed and Sztáray badly wounded. The combat at Diersheim was a waste of lives because Napoleon Bonaparte signed the Preliminaries of Leoben with Austria a few days earlier, calling for a truce. However, Moreau's reputation was enhanced by his hard-won victory which occurred during the War of the First Coalition, part of the French Revolutionary Wars. Diersheim is one of a number of villages that make up the municipality of Rheinau. Diersheim lies one kilometer southwest of the Rhine River and about 9 kilometres (5.6 mi) northeast of Kehl.
