= Battle of Altenkirchen =

Battle of the War of the First Coalition

Coordinates: 50°41′14″N 7°38′44″E

- Part of War of the First Coalition
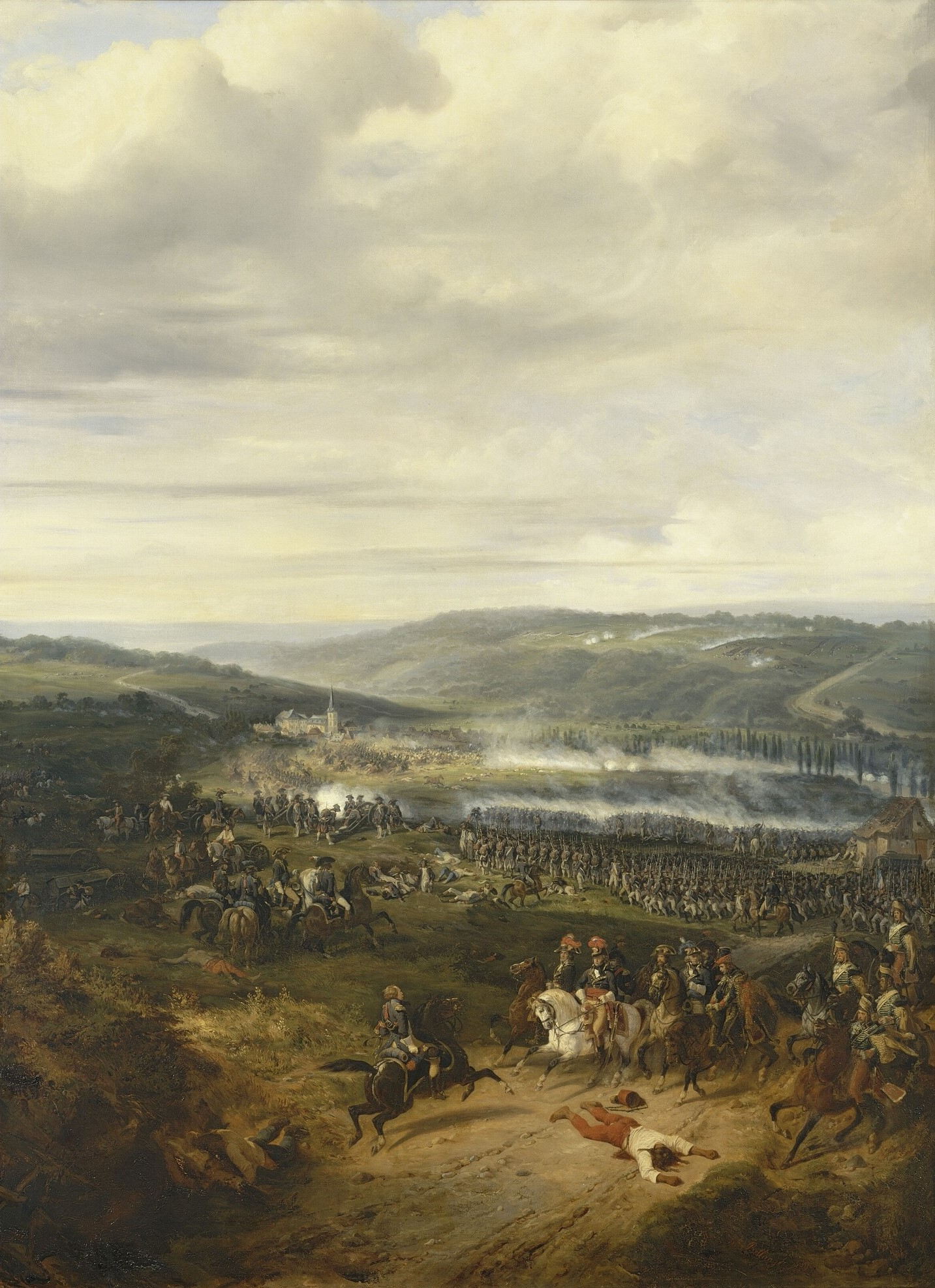
- Battle of Altenkirchen, 4 June 1796 by Hippolyte Bellangé, 1838-1839
Date	4 June 1796
Location	Altenkirchen, Germany
Result	French victory

Belligerents
(France) French Republic	(Habsburg monarchy) Habsburg Austria

Commanders and leaders
(France) Jean Baptiste Kléber	(Habsburg monarchy) Duke Ferdinand of Württemberg

Units involved
(France) Army of Sambre-et-Meuse	(Habsburg monarchy) Army of the Lower Rhine

Strength
20,000	20,000

Casualties and losses
Light	1,500, 12 guns

The Battle of Altenkirchen (4 June 1796) saw two Republican French divisions commanded by Jean Baptiste Kléber attack a wing of the Habsburg Austrian army led by Duke Ferdinand Frederick Augustus of Württemberg. A frontal attack combined with a flanking maneuver forced the Austrians to retreat. Three future Marshals of France played significant roles in the engagement: François Joseph Lefebvre as a division commander, Jean-de-Dieu Soult as a brigadier and Michel Ney as leader of a flanking column. The battle occurred during the War of the First Coalition, part of a larger conflict called the Wars of the French Revolution. Altenkirchen is located in the state of Rhineland-Palatinate in Germany about 50 kilometres (31 mi) east of Bonn.

The French opened the Rhine Campaign of 1796 by ordering Kléber to attack south out of his bridgehead at Düsseldorf. After Kléber won sufficient maneuver room on the east bank of the Rhine River, Jean Baptiste Jourdan was supposed to join him with the remainder of the Army of Sambre-et-Meuse. But this was only a distraction. When the Austrians under Archduke Charles, Duke of Teschen moved north to oppose Jourdan, Jean Victor Marie Moreau would cross the Rhine far to the south with the Army of Rhin-et-Moselle. Kléber carried out his part of the scheme to perfection, allowing Jourdan to cross the Rhine at Neuwied on 10 June. The next action was the Battle of Wetzlar on 15–16 June.
