= Army of the Rhine and Moselle =

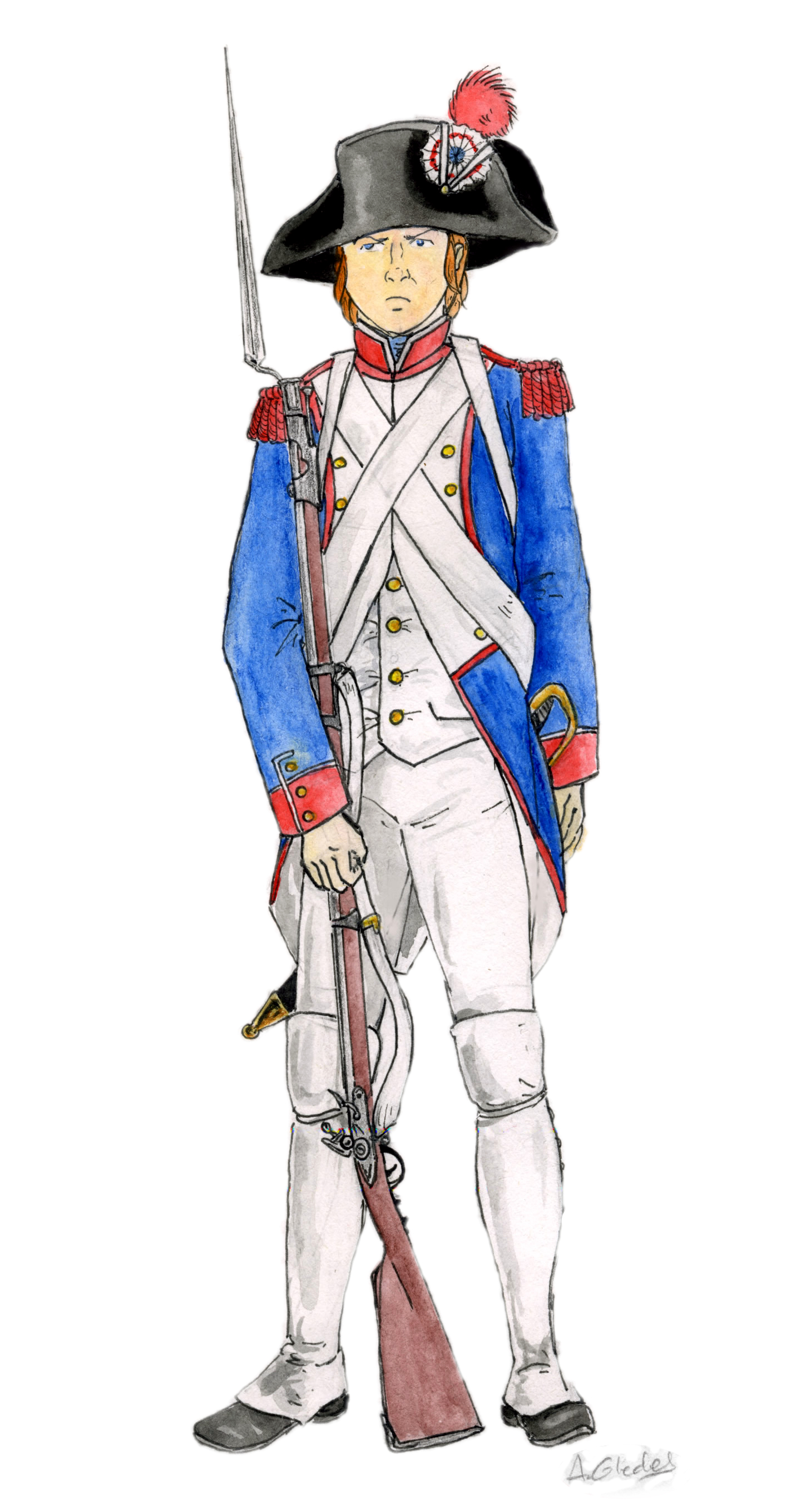
- Fusilier of a French Revolutionary Army
- Active: 20 April 1795 – 29 September 1797
- Disbanded: 29 September 1797 and units merged into Army of Germany
- Country: (French First Republic) French Republic
- Allegiance: First Republic

Commanders
- Notable commanders: Jean-Charles Pichegru; Jean Victor Marie Moreau; Louis Desaix; Laurent de Gouvion Saint-Cyr

The Army of the Rhine and Moselle (French: Armée de Rhin-et-Moselle) was one of the field units of the French Revolutionary Army. It was formed on 20 April 1795 by the merger of elements of the Army of the Rhine and the Army of the Moselle.

The Army of the Rhine and Moselle participated in two principal campaigns in the War of the First Coalition. Military planners in Paris formed armies based on specific strategic tasks, and the task of this Army was to secure the French frontier at the Rhine and to penetrate the German states, potentially threatening Vienna. The unsuccessful 1795 campaign concluded with the removal of General Jean-Charles Pichegru from command. In 1796, under the command of General Jean Victor Marie Moreau, the Army was more successful. After crushing the Reichsarmee's elements at Kehl, the Army advanced into southwestern Germany.

Its success depended on the cooperation with France's Army of the Sambre and Meuse, commanded by Jean-Baptiste Jourdan. In 1796, the jealousies between Jourdan and Moreau, and among the subcommanders, complicated the efficient operations of both armies. After a summer of maneuver in which the Coalition force enticed the French deeper and deeper into German territory, the Habsburg commander Archduke Charles, Duke of Teschen drubbed the French at Wurzburg and at second Wetzlar, and then defeated Jourdan's army at the Limburg-Altenkirchen. These battles destroyed any chance that Jourdan's force and Moreau's Army of the Rhine and Moselle could merge. Once Jourdan withdrew to the west bank of the Rhine, Charles could focus his attention on Moreau. By October they were fighting on the western slope of the Black Forest, and by December Charles had the French forces under siege at the principal river crossings of Kehl and Hüningen. By early 1797 the French had relinquished control of the bridgeheads over the Rhine. After an abbreviated German campaign in 1797, the French and Austrians agreed to the Treaty of Campo Formio and, on 29 September 1797, the Army of the Rhine and Moselle merged with the Army of the Sambre and Meuse to form the Army of Germany.

The Army of the Rhine and Moselle campaigns provided experience for a cadre of young officers. In his five-volume analysis of the Revolutionary Armies, Ramsey Weston Phipps called the Army of the Rhine and Moselle a "school for marshals", to emphasize the importance of experience under these conditions in training the future leadership of Napoleon's army.

== Background ==
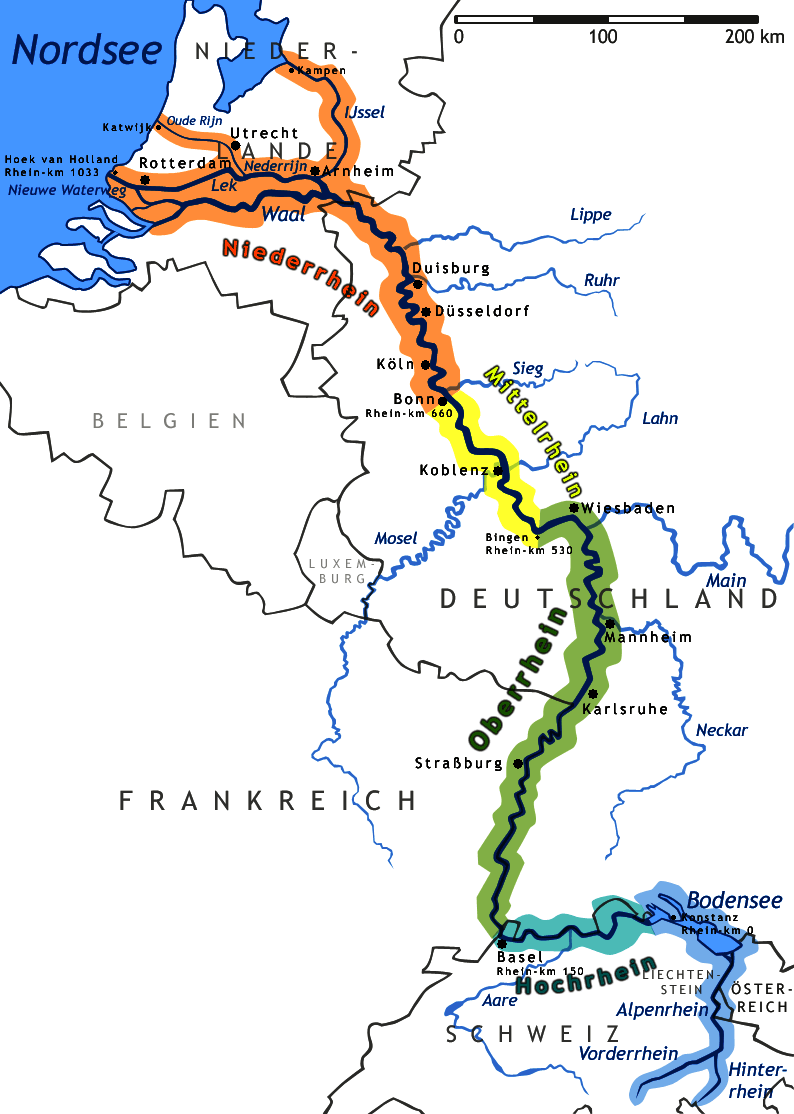
The broad Rhine River and its many tributaries prevented easy escape into France. The colors represent the different sections of the Rhine: Mountain Rhine (Alpenrhein), High Rhine (Hochrhein), Upper Rhine (Oberrhein), Middle Rhine (Mittelrhein), Low Rhine (Niederrhein).

The rulers of Europe viewed the 1789 revolution in France as an internal matter between the French king and his subjects. In 1790, Leopold succeeded his brother Joseph as emperor of the Holy Roman Empire; by 1791, the danger to his sister, Marie Antoinette and her children, alarmed him. In August 1791, in consultation with French émigré nobles and Frederick William II of Prussia, Leopold's Declaration of Pillnitz articulated that the interests of the monarchs of Europe were as one with the interests of Louis and his family. He and his fellow monarchs threatened unspecified consequences if anything should happen to the royal family. French émigrés continued to agitate for support of a counter-revolution, and on 20 April 1792 the French National Convention declared war on Austria. In this War of the First Coalition (1792–1798), France ranged itself against most of the European states sharing its land or water borders, plus Portugal and the Ottoman Empire.

Elements of the armies that were later formed into the Army of the Rhine and Moselle participated in the conquest of the Netherlands and the siege of Luxembourg. The various elements of the army won a victory at the Battle of Fleurus on 16 June 1794. Shortly after Fleurus, the position of the First Coalition in Flanders collapsed and the French armies overran the Austrian Netherlands and the Dutch Republic in the winter of 1794–1795. French and Coalition military strategy subsequently focused on the Rhine river as the principle line of defense: for each side, control of the opposite bank or, at least, the river's principal crossings, was the basis of defensive strategy.

== Purpose and formation ==
=== Military challenges ===
By 1792 the armies of the French Republic were in a state of disruption; experienced soldiers of the Ancien Régime fought side by side with volunteers. Recruits, urged on by revolutionary fervor from the special representatives—agents of the legislature sent to ensure cooperation among the military—lacked the discipline and training to function efficiently; frequently insubordinate, they often refused orders and undermined unit cohesion. After a defeat, they were capable of mutiny, as Théobald Dillon learned when his troops lynched him in 1792.

Military cohesion became more acute following the 1793 introduction of mass conscription, the levée en masse. The basic unit of the army, the demi-brigade, mixed the men of the old army with the recruits from the levée en masse. Ideally, it was designed to include the regular infantry inherited from the old Royal regiments, who were relatively well-trained and equipped, dressed in white uniforms and wearing tarleton helmets, with the national guard units, who were less well-trained or equipped, with blue uniforms, and the fédéré volunteer battalions, who were poorly trained and equipped, with no uniform other than a red phrygian cap and a cockade of France.

Disruption reached the upper echelons of the army. French commanders walked a fine line between the security of the frontier and the Parisian clamor for victory. Commanders were constantly under suspicion from the representatives of the new regime and sometimes from their own soldiers. Failure to achieve unrealistic expectations implied disloyalty and the price of disloyalty was an appointment with Madame guillotine: several of the highest ranking generals, including the aged Nicolas Luckner, Jean Nicolas Houchard, Adam Philippe Custine, Arthur Dillon and Antoine Nicolas Collier, were killed. Francisco de Miranda's failure to take Maastricht landed him in La Force Prison for several years. Many of the old officer class had emigrated, forming émigré armies; the cavalry in particular suffered from their departure and the Hussards du Saxe and the 15éme Cavalerie (Royal Allemande) regiments defected en masse to the Austrians. The artillery arm, considered by the old nobility to be an inferior assignment, was less affected by emigration and survived intact.

By 1794-95, military planners in Paris considered the upper Rhine Valley, the south-western German territories and Danube river basin of strategic importance for the defense of the Republic. The Rhine offered a formidable barrier to what the French perceived as Austrian aggression and the state that controlled its crossings controlled the river and access into the territories on either side. Ready access across the Rhine and along the Rhine bank between the German states and Switzerland or through the Black Forest, gave access to the upper Danube river valley. For the French, control of the Upper Danube or any point in between, was of immense strategic value and would give the French a reliable approach to Vienna. The planners also understood the importance of moving the French army out of France and into the territories of other polities. Theirs was an army entirely dependent for support upon the countryside it occupied. Parisian revolutionaries and military commanders alike believed an assault into the German states was essential, not only in terms of war aims, but also in practical terms: the French Directory believed that war should pay for itself and did not budget for the payment or feeding of its troops. Although this solved some of the problems of feeding and paying the army, it did not solve them all. Until April 1796, soldiers were paid in an increasingly worthless paper currency called the Assignat; after April, pay was made in metallic value, but pay was still in arrears. Throughout the spring and early summer, the soldiers were in almost constant mutiny: in May 1796, in the border town of Zweibrücken, a demi-brigade revolted. In June, pay for two demi-brigades were in arrears and two companies rebelled.

=== Formation ===
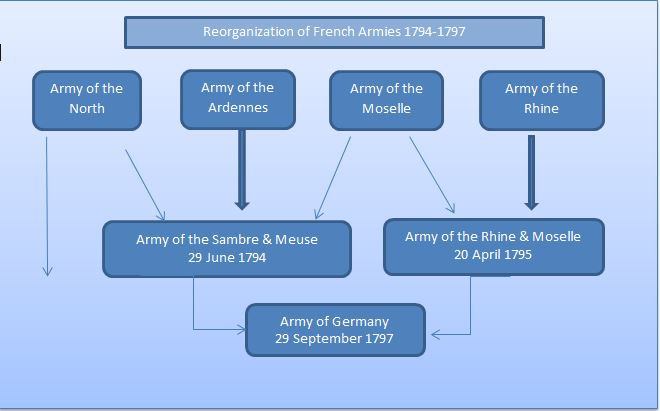
The two principal French Armies of 1794 were formed from four smaller units, each contributing a portion of its troops to either the Sambre and Meuse or the Army of the Rhine and Moselle. The right flank of Army of the North remained in the Netherlands.

In late 1794, military planners in Paris reorganized the army into task forces. The right flank of the Armies of the Center, later called the Army of the Moselle, the entire Army of the North and the Army of the Ardennes were combined to form the Army of the Sabre and Meuse, which was stationed on the west bank of the Rhine north of the junction of the Main and the Rhine rivers.

The remaining units of the former Army of the Center and the Army of the Rhine were united, initially on 29 November 1794, and formally on 20 April 1795, under command of Jean-Charles Pichegru. These troops were stationed further south, in a line that stretched on the west bank of the Rhine from Basel to the Main River.

At Basel, where the river makes a wide, northerly turn at the Rhine knee, it enters what the locals call the Rhine Ditch (Rheingraben). This forms part of a rift valley some 31 km (19 mi) wide bordered by the mountainous Black Forest on the east (German side) and the Vosges mountains on the west (French side). At the far edges of the eastern flood plain, tributaries cut deep defiles into the western slope of the mountains. Further to the north, the river became deeper and faster, until it widened into a delta where it emptied into the North Sea.

== Campaign of 1795 ==
The Rhine Campaign of 1795 (April 1795 to January 1796) opened both French armies attempted to cross the Rhine and capture the Fortress of Mainz. The French Army of the Sambre and Meuse, commanded by Jean-Baptiste Jourdan, confronted Count Clerfayt's Army of the Lower Rhine in the north, while the French Army of Rhine and Moselle under Pichegru lay opposite Dagobert Sigmund von Wurmser's army in the south. From April until August, both sides engaged in a waiting game until, in August, Jourdan crossed and quickly seized Düsseldorf. The Army of the Sambre and Meuse advanced south to the Main River, completely isolating Mainz. Pichegru's Army of the Rhine and Moselle surprised the Bavarian garrison of Mannheim; by mid-month, both French armies held significant footholds on the east bank of the Rhine. The French fumbled away the promising start to their offensive. Pichegru bungled at least one opportunity to seize Clerfayt's supply base in the Battle of Handschuhsheim, with resultant significant losses. With Pichegru unexpectedly inactive, Clerfayt massed against Jourdan, beat him at Höchst in October, and forced most of the Army of the Sambre and Meuse to retreat to the west bank of the Rhine.

These maneuvers left the Army of the Rhine and Moselle isolated. When Wurmser sealed off the French bridgehead at Mannheim, the Army of the Rhine and Moselle was trapped on the east bank. The Austrians defeated the left wing of the Army of Rhine and Moselle at the Battle of Mainz and moved down the west bank. In November, Clerfayt defeated Pichegru at Pfeddersheim and successfully wrapped up the siege of Mannheim. In January 1796, Clerfayt concluded an armistice with the French, sending the Army of the Rhine and Moselle back to France, and retaining a large portions of the west bank.

== Campaign in 1796 ==
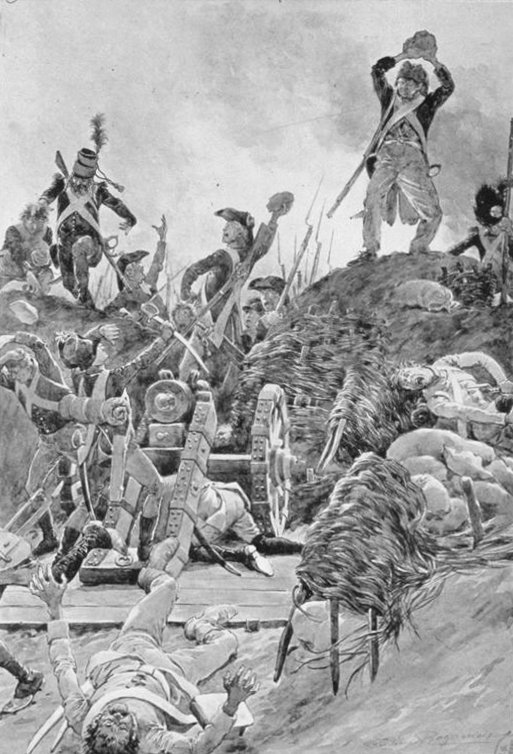
French soldiers overwhelmed the Swabian militia.

The opening of the Rhine Campaign of 1796 began with Jean-Baptiste Kléber's attack south of his bridgehead at Düsseldorf. After Kléber won sufficient maneuver room on the east bank of the Rhine River, Jean Baptiste Jourdan was supposed to join him with the remainder of the Army of the Sambre and Meuse. At the first battles of Altenkirchen (4 June 1796) and Wetzlar, two Republican French divisions commanded by Kléber attacked a wing of the Habsburg army led by Duke Ferdinand Frederick Augustus of Württemberg. A frontal attack combined with a flanking maneuver forced the Austrians to retreat. Three future Marshals of France played significant roles in the engagement at Altenkirchen: François Joseph Lefebvre as a division commander, Jean-de-Dieu Soult, as a brigadier and Michel Ney, as leader of a flanking column. Altenkirchen is located in the state of Rhineland-Palatinate about 50 km (31 mi) east of Bonn. Wetzlar was located in the Landgraviate of Hesse-Kassel, 66 kilometers (41 mi) north of Frankfurt. Altenkirchen was only a distraction to entice the Austrian commander to move troops from the south to strengthen his force in the middle Rhine; Moreau lent credence to this distraction by seeming to move part of the Army of the Rhine and Moselle north from Strasburg. When Archduke Charles moved troops north to oppose what looked to be a crossing in force, Moreau reversed to Kehl and crossed the river. Kléber carried out his part of the scheme to perfection.

The opposition armies of the First Coalition included imperial (Reichsarmee) contingents and the infantry and cavalry of the various states, amounting to about 125,000 (including the three autonomous corps), a sizeable force by eighteenth century standards but a moderate force by the standards of the later Revolutionary wars. In total, though, Imperial and Habsburg troops stretched in a line from Switzerland to the North Sea and Wurmser's troops stretched from the Swiss-Italian border to the Adriatic; furthermore, a portion of the troops in Fürstenberg's corps were pulled in July to support Wurmser's activities in Italy. Habsburg troops comprised the bulk of the army, but the thin white line of Habsburg infantry could not cover the territory from Basel to Frankfurt with sufficient depth to resist the pressure of the opposition. In spring 1796, drafts from the free imperial cities, and other imperial estates, augmented the Habsburg force with perhaps 20,000 men at the most. It was largely guesswork where they would be placed, and Archduke Charles, commander of the Reichsarmee and the Habsburg forces, did not like to use the militias, which were poorly trained and unseasoned. Compared to French coverage, Charles had only half the number of troops extended over a 211-mile front, stretching from Basel to Bingen. Furthermore, Charles had concentrated the bulk of his force, commanded by Count Baillet Latour, between Karlsruhe and Darmstadt, where the confluence of the Rhine and the Main river made an attack most likely, as it offered a gateway into eastern German states and ultimately to Vienna, with sturdy bridges crossing the relatively well-defined river bank. To the north, Wilhelm von Wartensleben’s autonomous corps stretched in a thin line between Mainz and Giessen.

On 22 June, the Army of the Rhine and Moselle executed simultaneous crossings at Kehl and Hüningen. At Kehl, Moreau's advance guard, 10,000 men, preceded the main force of 27,000 infantry and 3,000 cavalry directed at a mere several hundred Swabian pickets on the bridge. The Swabians were hopelessly outnumbered and could not be reinforced. Most of the Imperial Army of the Rhine was stationed further north, by Mannheim, where the river was easier to cross. Neither Louis Joseph, Prince of Condé's Army of Condé in Freiburg nor Karl Aloys zu Fürstenberg's force in Rastatt could reach Kehl in time to relieve the Swabian troops. Consequently, within a day, Moreau had four divisions across the river. Unceremoniously thrust out of Kehl, the Swabian contingent reformed at Rastatt by 5 July, which they held until reinforcements arrived. Furthermore, at Hüningen, near Basel, Ferino executed a full crossing, and advanced east along the German shore of the Rhine with the 16th and 50th Demi-brigades, the 68th, 50th and 68th line infantry, and six squadrons of cavalry that included the 3rd and 7th Hussars and the 10th Dragoons. The Habsburg and Imperial armies were in danger of encirclement.

With Ferino's quick movements to encircle him, Charles executed an orderly withdrawal in four columns through the Black Forest, across the Upper Danube valley, and toward Bavaria. By mid-July, the French forces maintained persistent pressure on Charles' force. Two imperial columns encamped near Stuttgart were surrounded and surrendered, leading to a general armistice with the Swabian Circle. The third column, which included the Condé's Corps, retreated through Waldsee to Stockach, and eventually Ravensburg. The fourth Austrian column, the smallest (three battalions and four squadrons), under General Wolff, marched the length of the Bodensee's northern shore, via Überlingen, Meersburg, Buchhorn, and the Austrian city of Bregenz.

Location map shows the battles and sieges of the 1796 Rhine Campaign. Borders reflect boundaries of present-day Germany.

Given the size of the attacking force, Charles had to withdraw far enough into Bavaria to align his northern flank with Wartensleben's autonomous corps. As he withdrew, his own line compressed, making his army stronger; his opposition's flanks extended, making their line weaker. In the course of this withdrawal, most of the Swabian Circle was abandoned to the Army of the Rhine and Moselle, which enforced an armistice and extracted sizeable reparations; in addition, the French occupied several principal towns in southwestern Germany, including Stockach, Meersburg, Constance, Überlingen am Bodensee, Ulm, and Augsburg. As Charles withdrew further east, the neutral zone expanded, eventually encompassing most of southern German states and the Ernestine duchies.

=== Summer of 1796 ===
By mid-summer, the strategic goals of the Army of the Rhine and Moselle appeared to have succeeded; Jourdan or Moreau seemed on the brink of flanking Charles and Wartensleben, forcing a wedge between the two; inexplicably, Wartensleben continued to withdraw to the east-north-east, despite Charles' orders to unite with him. At the Battle of Neresheim on 11 August, Moreau crushed Charles' force and at last, however, Wartensleben recognized the danger; he changed direction, moving his corps to join at Charles' northern flank. At the Battle of Amberg on 24 August, Charles inflicted another defeat on the French, but that same day, his commanders lost a battle to the French at Friedberg, when the French army, which was advancing eastward on the south side of the Danube, isolated an Austrian infantry unit, Schröder Infantry Regiment Nr. 7, and the French Army of Condé. In the ensuing clash, the Austrians and Royalists were cut to pieces.

The tide now turned in the Coalition's favor. Both French Armies had overstretched their lines, moving far into the German states, and were separated too far from each other for one to offer the other aid or security. The Coalition's concentration of troops forced a wider wedge between the two armies of Jourdan and Moreau, what the French had tried to do to Charles and Wartensleben. Despite Charles' instructions to withdraw northward toward Ingolstadt, Maximilian Anton Karl, Count Baillet de Latour retreated eastward to protect the borders of Austria. Moreau did not seize the opportunity to place his army between the two Austrian forces (Wartensleben's and Charles'). As the French withdrew toward the Rhine, Charles and Wartensleben pressed forward. On 3 September at Würzburg, Jourdan attempted unsuccessfully to halt the retreat; at the Battle of Limburg, Charles pushed him back to the Rhine.

Once Moreau received word of Jourdan's defeat, he initiated his withdrawal from southern Germany. Retreating through the Black Forest, with Ferino supervising the rear guard, he claimed one more victory: an Austrian corps commanded by Latour drew too close to Moreau at Biberach and lost 4,000 prisoners, some standards and artillery; Latour followed at a more sensible distance. Both sides were hampered by heavy rains; the ground was soft and slippery, and the Rhine and Elz rivers had flooded. This increased the hazards of mounted attack, because the horses could not get a good footing. Archduke's force pursued the French, although carefully. The French attempted to slow their pursuers by destroying bridges, but the Austrians repaired them and crossed the swollen rivers despite the high waters. Upon reaching a few miles east of Emmendingen, the Archduke split his force into four columns. Friedrich Joseph, Count of Nauendorf's column, in the upper Elz, had eight battalions and 14 squadrons, advancing southwest to Waldkirch; Wartensleben had 12 battalions and 23 squadrons advancing south to capture the Elz bridge at Emmendingen. Latour, with 6,000 men, was to cross the foothills via Heimbach and Malterdingen, and capture the bridge of Köndringen, between Riegel and Emmendingen, and Karl Aloys zu Fürstenberg's column held Kinzingen, about 3.2 kilometers (2 mi) north of Riegel. Frölich and Condé (part of Nauendorf's column) were to pin down Ferino and the French right wing in the Stieg valley. Nauendorf's men were able to ambush St.-Cyr's advance; Latour's columns attacked Beaupuy at Matterdingen, killing the general and throwing his column into confusion. Wartensleben, in the center, was held up by French riflemen until his third (reserve) detachment arrived to outflank them; the French retreated across the rivers, destroying all the bridges.

After the shambles at Emmendingen, the French withdrew to the south and west, and formed for battle by Schliengen. There, Moreau established his army along a ridge of hills, in a 11-kilometer (7 mi) semi-circle on heights that commanded the terrain below. Given the severe condition of the roads at the end of October, Archduke Charles could not flank the right French wing. The French left wing lay too close to the Rhine, and the French center was unassailable. Instead, he attacked the French flanks directly, and in force, which increased casualties for both sides. The Duc d'Enghien led a spirited (but unauthorized) attack on the French left, cutting their access to a withdrawal through Kehl. Nauendorf's column marched all night and half of the day, and attacked the French right, pushing them further back. In the night, while Charles planned his next day's attack, Moreau began the withdrawal of his troops toward Hüningen. Although the French and the Austrians both claimed victory at the time, military historians generally agree that the Austrians achieved a strategic advantage. However, the French withdrew from the battlefield in good order and several days later crossed the Rhine River at Hüningen.

After Schliengen, both the French and the Coalition sought to control the Rhine river crossings at Kehl and Hüningen. At Kehl, 20,000 French defenders under Louis Desaix and the overall commander of the French force, Jean Victor Marie Moreau, almost upset the siege when they executed a sortie that nearly captured the Austrian artillery park; the French managed to capture 1,000 Austrian troops in the melee. On 9 January the French general Desaix proposed the evacuation to General Latour and they agreed that the Austrians would enter Kehl the next day, on 10 January at 16:00. The French immediately repaired the bridge, rendered passable by 14:00, which gave them 24 hours to evacuate everything of value and to raze everything else. By the time Latour took possession of the fortress, nothing remained of any use: all palisades, ammunition, even the carriages of the bombs and howitzers, had been evacuated. The French insured that nothing remained behind that could be used by the Austrian/Imperial army; even the fortress itself was but earth and ruins. The siege concluded 115 days after its investment, following 50 days of open trenches, the point at which active fighting began.

At Hüningen Karl Aloys zu Fürstenberg's force initiated the siege within days of the Austrian victory at the Battle of Schliengen. Most of the siege ran concurrently with the siege at Kehl, which concluded on 9 January 1797. Troops engaged at Kehl marched to Hüningen in preparation for a major assault, but the French defenders capitulated on 1 February 1797. The French commander, Jean Charles Abbatucci, was killed in the early days of the fighting, and replaced by Georges Joseph Dufour. The trenches, opened originally in November, had refilled with winter rain and snow in the intervening weeks. Fürstenberg ordered them opened again, and the water drained out on 25 January. The Coalition force secured the earthworks surrounding the trenches. On 31 January the French failed to push the Austrians out. Archduke Charles arrived that day and met with Fürstenberg at nearby Lörrach. The night of 31 January to 1 February was relatively tranquil, marred only by ordinary artillery fire and shelling. At mid-day 1 February 1797, as the Austrians prepared to storm the bridgehead, General of Division Dufour pre-empted what would have been a costly attack for both sides, offering to surrender the position. On 5 February, Fürstenberg finally took possession of the bridgehead.

Following the losses in 1796 and early 1797, the French regrouped their forces on the west side of the Rhine. An abbreviated campaign in late spring of 1797 led to Austrians and the French to agree to the Treaty of Campo Formio, ending the War of the First Coalition. The subsequent armistice at Leoben led to long term negotiations for peace between Revolutionary France and Austria. On 29 September 1797, the Army of the Rhine and Moselle merged with the Army of the Sambre and Meuse to form the Army of Germany.

== Organizational and command problems ==
Excruciating command challenges plagued the Army of the Rhine and Moselle in its early operations. The campaign of 1795 had been entirely a French failure and the difficulties the Army of the Rhine and Moselle faced, especially in 1795, had much to do with Pichegru's own situation: his competition with both Moreau and Jourdan and his disaffection with the direction in which the revolution was headed. Originally a dedicated Jacobin, by 1794, his own intrigues had placed him in command after he had undermined Lazare Hoche the previous year, insuring his own appointment as commander of this army. As the revolution waxed and waned in its ardency, however, so did Pichegru to its principles: by late 1794, he was leaning heavily toward the royalist cause. The Directory replaced him with Desaix, and later Moreau. Undeniably a capable, possibly brilliant, and popular commander, Pichegru began his second campaign by crossing the Meuse on 18 October. After taking Nijmegen, he drove the Austrians across the Rhine. Then, instead of going into winter quarters, he prepared his army for a winter campaign, always a difficult proposition in the eighteenth century. Several brilliant actions in the winter established Pichegru's position. Pichegru's actions sometimes seemed inexplicable: although an associate, even a friend, of the recently executed Saint-Just, Pichegru offered his services to the Thermidorian Reaction; after having received the title of Sauveur de la Patrie ("Saviour of the Fatherland") from the National Convention, he subdued the sans-culottes of Paris during the bread riots of 1 April 1795. As a hero of the Revolution captured Mannheim but inexplicably he allowed his colleague Jourdan to be defeated; throughout 1796, his machinations in Paris complicated the conduct of operations in Germany by undermining the senior command confidence.

In the field in 1796, competition between generals, not ideology, caused command problems. Jealousies between Jourdan and Moreau further complicated the success of the Army of the Rhine and Moselle by refusing to unite their fronts. Moreau moved rapidly into Bavarian and toward Vienna, as if he commanded the only French army in the German states. Frustration created rivalries between and among subcommanders. Ferino continued his seemingly random maneuvers along the border with Switzerland, and through the Swabian Circle, as if he too were operating autonomously. These problems were not limited to Moreau's army; in the Army of the Sambre and Meuse, Jourdan had a spat with his wing commander Kléber and that officer suddenly resigned. Two generals from Kléber's clique, Bernadotte and Colaud, also made excuses to leave immediately. Faced with this mutiny, Jourdan replaced Bernadotte with General Henri Simon and divided Colaud's rebellious units among the other divisions.

=== School for marshals ===
The campaigns in which the Army of the Rhine and Moselle participated also provided exceptional experience for a cadre of extraordinary young officers. In his five-volume analysis of the Revolutionary Armies, Ramsey Weston Phipps emphasized the importance of experience under these trying conditions of manpower shortage, poor training, equipment and supply shortage, and tactical and strategic confusion and interference. Phipps's objective was to show how the training received in the early years of the war varied not only with the theater in which they served but also with the character of the army to which they belonged. The experience of young officers under the tutelage of such experienced men as Pichegru, Moreau, Lazar Hoche, Lefebvre, and Jourdan provided young officers with valuable experience.

Phipps' analysis is not singular, although his lengthy volumes address in detail the value of this "school for marshals." In 1895, Richard Phillipson Dunn-Pattison also singled out the French Revolutionary army as "the finest school the world has yet seen for an apprenticeship in the trade of arms. The resurrection of the Ancien Régime civil dignity of the marchalate allowed Emperor Napoleon I to strengthen his newly-created power. He could reward the most valuable of his generals or soldiers who had held significant commands during the French Revolutionary Wars. The Army of the Rhine and Moselle (and its subsequent incarnations) included five future Marshals of France: Jean-Baptiste Jourdan, its commander-in-chief, Jean-Baptiste Drouet, Laurent de Gouvion Saint-Cyr, and Édouard Adolphe Casimir Joseph Mortier. François Joseph Lefebvre, by 1804 an old man, was named an honorary marshal, but not awarded a field position. Michel Ney, in the 1795–1799 campaigns an intrepid cavalry commander, came into his own command under the tutelage of Moreau and Massena in the south German and Swiss campaigns. Jean de Dieu Soult had served under Moreau and Massena, becoming the latter's right-hand man during the Swiss campaign of 1799–1800. Jean Baptiste Bessieres, like Ney, had been a competent and sometimes inspired regimental commander in 1796. MacDonald, Oudinot and Saint-Cyr, participants in the 1796 campaign, all received honors in the third, fourth and fifth promotions (1809, 1811, 1812).

== Commanders ==
Image	Name	Dates
portrait of a man in army uniform and white powdered hair	Jean-Charles Pichegru	20 April 1795 – 4 March 1796
Side portrait of a man in white coat, with unpowdered hair.	Louis Desaix	5 March – 20 April 1796 Temporary command
portrait of man with short hair, high collared military coat.	Jean Victor Marie Moreau	21 April 1796 – 30 January 1797 also had overall command of the Army of the Sambre and Meuse
	Louis Desaix	31 January – 9 March 1797 temporary command/armistice in effect
	Jean Victor Marie Moreau	10 March – 27 March 1797 temporary command/armistice in effect
	Louis Desaix	27 March – 19 April 1797 temporary command/armistice in effect
portrait of a man with short hair, military awards and a sash	Laurent de Gouvion Saint-Cyr	20 April – 9 September 1797 subordinate to Lazare Hoche

== Order of Battle in 1796 ==
The Army included 66 battalions and 79 squadrons, totaling 78,503 men, including 71,756 infantry, 6,936 cavalry and 1,811 artillery on 1 June 1796:

Commander in Chief (1796) Jean Victor Marie Moreau

Chief of Staff: Jean Louis Ebénézer Reynier
Commander of Artillery: Jean-Baptiste Eblé
Commander of Engineers: Dominique-André de Chambarlhac

1796 Order of Battle
Left	Center and Reserve	Right
Commander of the Left Wing Louis Desaix	Commander of the Center Gouvion Saint Cyr; Commander of the Reserve François Antoine Louis Bourcier	Commander of the Right Wing Pierre Marie Barthélemy Ferino
Division Commander Antoine Guillaume Delmas: Brigade: Maurice Frimont; 16th Light Infantry Demi-brigade (three battalions) (Note: The French Army designated two kinds of infantry: principally the line infantry (French: infanterie de ligne), which fought in tight formations, and the light infantry (French: infanterie légère) to provide skirmishing cover for the troops that followed. Smith, p. 15.); 50th Line Infantry Demi-brigade (three battalions); 7th Hussar Regiment (four squadrons); Brigade: Jean Marie Rodolph Eickemayer; 97th Line Infantry Demi-brigade (three balloons); 10th Dragoon Regiment (four squadrons); 17th Dragoon Regiment (four squadrons); Division: Michel de Beaupuy; Brigade Joseph Martin Bruneteau, also known as Sainte-Suzanne; 10th Light Infantry Demi-brigade (three battalions); 10th Line Infantry Demi-brigade (three battalions); 4th Chasseurs à cheval Regiment (four squadrons); 8th Chasseurs à cheval Regiment (four squadrons); Brigade: Dominique Joba; 62nd Line Infantry Demi-brigade (three battalions); 103rd Line Infantry Demi-brigade (three battalions); 6th Dragoon Regiment (four squadrons); Artillery – 556 men; Brigade: Jean Victor Tharreau; 89th Line Infantry Demi-brigade (three battalions); 36th Line Infantry Demi-brigade (three battalions); 18th Cavalry Regiment (four squadrons, unknown type); Division: Charles Antoine Xaintrailles; Brigade: Jean-Marie Forest; unknown Line Infantry demi-brigade (three battalions); 1st Carabinier Regiment (four squadrons); 2nd Carabinier Regiment (four squadrons)	Division: Guillaume Philibert Duhesme and Alexandre Camille Taponier; Brigade: Dominique Vandamme; 17th Line Infantry Demi-brigade (three battalions); 100th Line Infantry Demi-brigade (three battalions); 20th Chasseurs à cheval Regiment (four squadrons); 11th Hussar Regiment (one squadron); Brigade François Laroche; 21st Line Infantry Demi-brigade (three battalions); 31st Line Infantry Demi-brigade (three battalions); 9th Hussar Regiment (one squadron); Brigade Claude Lecourbe; 84th Line Infantry Demi-brigade (three battalions); 106th Line Infantry Demi-brigade (three battalions); 2nd Chasseurs à cheval Regiment (four squadrons); Artillery (unknown count); Reserve Commander François Antoine Louis Bourcier: 109th Line Infantry Demi-brigade (three battalions); 2nd Cavalry Regiment (four squadrons); 15th Cavalry Regiment (four squadrons); 3rd Cavalry Regiment (four squadrons)	Division: Henri François Delaborde; Brigade: Nicolas Louis Jordy; 3rd Line Infantry Demi-brigade (three battalions); 38th Line Infantry Demi-brigade (three battalions); 21st Cavalry Regiment (1 squadron); Brigades Jean-Baptiste de Bressoles de Sisce and Jean-Baptiste Nouvion (Note: These brigades probably included the 16th and 50th Demi-brigades, the 68th, 50th and 68th Regiments de ligne, and six squadrons of cavalry that included the 3rd and 7th Hussars and the 10th Dragoons. See Graham, pp. 18–22.); Division Augustin Tuncq; Brigade Paillard; 3rd Light Infantry Demi-brigade (three battalions); 79th Line Infantry Demi-brigade (three battalions); 12th Cavalry Regiment (4 squadrons); Brigade Jean-Baptiste Tholmé; 74th Line Infantry Demi-brigade (three battalions); 4th Dragoon Regiment (four squadrons); 7th Hussar Regiment (four squadrons); Artillery (artillery unit of 822 men)

== Notes, citations and references ==
=== References ===
- Alison, Archibald. History of Europe from the Commencement of the French Revolution to the Restoration of the Bourbons, Volume 3. Edinburgh, W. Blackwood, 1847. OCLC 6051293
- The Annual Register: World Events 1796.. London, FC and J Rivington. 1813. Accessed 4 November 2014. OCLC 264471215
- Blanning, Timothy. The French Revolutionary Wars. New York: Oxford University Press, 1996. ISBN 978-0340569115
- Beevor, Antony. Berlin: The Downfall 1945. New York, Viking-Penguin Books, 2002. ISBN 0-670-88695-5
- Bertaud, Jean Paul and R.R. Palmer (trans). The Army of the French Revolution: From Citizen-Soldiers to Instrument of Power. Princeton: Princeton University Press, 1988. OCLC 17954374
- Bodart, Gaston. Losses of Life in Modern Wars, Austria-Hungary. London, Clarendon Press, 1916. OCLC 1458451
- (in German) Charles, Archduke of Austria (unattributed). Geschichte des Feldzuges von 1796 in Deutschland. France, 1796. OCLC 693115692
- (in German) Charles, Archduke of Austria, Grundsätze der Strategie: Erläutert durch die Darstellung des Feldzugs von 1796 in Deutschland, [Vienna], Strauss, 1819. OCLC 444880753
- (in French) Clerget, Charles. Tableaux des armées françaises: pendant les guerres de la Révolution. R. Chapelot, 1905. OCLC 13730761
- Cuccia, Phillip. Napoleon in Italy: The Sieges of Mantua, 1796–1799, Tulsa, University of Oklahoma Press, 2014. ISBN 978-0806144450
- Dodge, Theodore Ayrault. Warfare in the Age of Napoleon: The Revolutionary Wars Against the First Coalition in Northern Europe and the Italian Campaign, 1789–1797. USA: Leonaur Ltd., 2011 ISBN 978-0-85706-598-8.
- Dunn-Pattison, Richard Phillipson. Napoleon's Marshals, Wakefield, EP Pub., 1977 (reprint of 1895 edition). OCLC 3438894
- Durant, Will and Ariel Durant, The Age of Napoleon. New York, Simon and Schuster, 1975. OCLC 1256901
- (in German) Ebert, Jens-Florian "Feldmarschall-Leutnant Fürst zu Fürstenberg," Die Österreichischen Generäle 1792–1815. Napoleon Online: Portal zu Epoch. Markus Stein, editor. Mannheim, Germany. 14 February 2010 version. Accessed 28 February 2010.
- (in German) Ersch, Johann Samuel. Allgemeine encyclopädie der wissenschaften und künste in alphabetischer folge von genannten schrifts bearbeitet und herausgegeben. Leipzig, J. F. Gleditsch, 1889. OCLC 978611925
- Graham, Thomas, 1st Baron Lynedoch. The History of the Campaign of 1796 in Germany and Italy. London, (np) 1797. OCLC 44868000
- Knepper, Thomas P. The Rhine. Handbook for Environmental Chemistry Series, Part L. New York: Springer, 2006. ISBN 978-3540293934.
- La Bédoyère, Charles Angélique François Huchet, Memoirs of the Public and Private Life of Napoleon Bonaparte. nl, G. Virtue, 1828. OCLC 5207764
- (in French) Lievyns, A., Jean Maurice Verdot, Pierre Bégat, Fastes de la Légion-d'honneur: biographie de tous les décorés accompagnée de l'histoire législative et réglementaire de l'ordre, Bureau de l'administration, 1844. OCLC 3903245
- (in German) Lühe, Hans Eggert Willibald von der. Militär-Conversations-Lexikon:Kehl (Uberfall 1796) & (Belagerung des Bruckenkopfes von 1796–1797), Volume 4. C. Brüggemann, 1834. OCLC 63336793
- Malte-Brun, Conrad. Universal Geography, Or, a Description of All the Parts of the World, on a New Plan: Spain, Portugal, France, Norway, Sweden, Denmark, Belgium, and Holland.. A. Black, 1831. OCLC 1171138
- McLynn, Frank. Napoleon: A Biography. New York, Arcade Pub., 2002. OCLC 49351026
- (in French) Mechel, Christian von, Tableaux historiques et topographiques ou relation exacte.... Basel, 1798. OCLC 715971198
- Millar, Stephen. Austrian infantry organization. Napoleon Series.org, April 2005. Accessed 21 Jan 2015.
- (in German) "Pichegru." Brockhaus Bilder-Conversations-Lexikon, Band 3. Leipzig, 1839, pp. 495–496. ISBN 9783898535465
- Philippart, John. Memoires etc. of General Moreau. London, A. J. Valpy, 1814. OCLC 8721194
- Phipps, Ramsey Weston, The Armies of the First French Republic: Volume II The Armées du Moselle, du Rhin, de Sambre-et-Meuse, de Rhin-et-Moselle. Pickle Partners Publishing, 2011 reprint (original publication 1923–1933) ISBN 9781908692252
- (in French) Relation de l'assassinat de M. Théobald Dillon, Maréchal-de-Camp, Commis à Lille, le 29 avril 1792. Imprimerie de Mignaret (4 May 1792). OCLC 560845873
- Rickard, J., Battle of Emmendingen; Ettlingen; Siege of Huningue, 26 October 1796 – 19 February 1797; Ettlingen. History of war.org. Accessed 18 November 2014.
- Rogers, Clifford, et al. The Oxford Encyclopedia of Medieval Warfare and Military Technology. Oxford, Oxford University Press, 2010. ISBN 978-0195334036.
- Rothenberg, Gunther E. (2007). Napoleon’s Great Adversaries: Archduke Charles and the Austrian Army, 1792–1914. Stroud, (Gloucester): Spellmount. ISBN 978-1-908692-25-2
- Rothenberg, Gunther E. "The Habsburg Army in the Napoleonic Wars (1792–1815)". Military Affairs, 37:1 (Feb 1973), 1–5. ISSN 0026-3931
- Rotteck, Carl von. General History of the World, np: C. F. Stollmeyer, 1842. OCLC 653511
- Schama, Simon. Patriots and Liberators. Revolution in the Netherlands 1780–1813. New York, Vintage books, 1998. OCLC 2331328
- Sellman, R. R. Castles and Fortresses. York (UK), Methuen, 1954. OCLC 12261230
- Smith, Digby. Napoleonic Wars Data Book, NY: Greenhill Press, 1996. ISBN 9781853672767
- Vann, James Allen. The Swabian Kreis: Institutional Growth in the Holy Roman Empire 1648–1715. Vol. LII, Studies Presented to International Commission for the History of Representative and Parliamentary Institutions. Bruxelles, Les Éditions de la Librairie Encyclopédique, 1975. OCLC 2276157
- (in German) Volk, Helmut. "Landschaftsgeschichte und Natürlichkeit der Baumarten in der Rheinaue." Waldschutzgebiete Baden-Württemberg, Band 10, pp. 159–167. OCLC 939802377
- Walker, Mack. German Home Towns: Community, State, and General Estate, 1648–1871. Ithaca, Cornell University Press, 1998. ISBN 0801406706
- Wilson, Peter Hamish. German Armies: War and German Politics 1648–1806. London: UCL Press, 1997. OCLC 52081917

=== Other useful sources ===
- Blanning, Timothy. The French Revolution in Germany. New York, Oxford University Press, 1983. ISBN 978-0198225645
- Dyke, Thomas, Jr. Traveling Memoirs during a Tour through Belgium, Rhenish Prussia, Germany. Volume 1. London: Longman, 1834.
- History of the Wars of the French Revolution: Including Sketches of the Civil History of Great Britain and France, from the Revolutionary Movements, 1788, to the Restoration of a General Peace. 1815, Kuhl, France, 1820.
- Jomini, Antoine-Henri (Baron). The Art of War,Wilder Publications, 2008, p. 173. Originally published in English in 1862. ISBN 9781934255582
- Sloane, W.M. Life of Napoleon. France, 1896 (reprint, 1910).
