= Battle of Wiesloch (1799) =

Battle of the Coalition Wars, 1799

- Part of War of the Second Coalition
- Location of Wiesloch in Baden-Württemberg
Date	3 December 1799
Location	Wiesloch 49°17′37″N 8°40′20″E
Result	Austrian victory

Belligerents
(Holy Roman Empire) Austria	France

Commanders and leaders
Count Anton Sztáray	Claude Lecourbe

Strength
5,000	17,000

Casualties and losses
500 (10%)	1,500 (8.82%)

War of the Second Coalition:
Austria
The color black indicates the current battle.

The Battle of Wiesloch (German: Schlacht bei Wiesloch) occurred on 3 December 1799, during the War of the Second Coalition, part of the French Revolutionary Wars. Lieutenant Field Marshal Anton Count Sztáray de Nagy-Mihaly commanded the far right wing protecting the main Austrian army in Swabia, under the command of Archduke Charles, Duke of Teschen. With the victory at Wiesloch (on 3 December), Sztáray's force drove the French from the right bank of the Rhine and relieved the fortress at Philippsburg.
