= Battle of Wetzlar =

Battle of the War of the First Coalition

Coordinates: 50°34′N 8°30′E

Battle of Wetzlar (1796)
- Part of War of the First Coalition
Date	15 June 1796
Location	Wetzlar, Germany
Result	Austrian victory

Belligerents
Republican France	(Habsburg monarchy) Habsburg Austria

Commanders and leaders
(France) General Jourdan	(Habsburg monarchy) Archduke Charles

Units involved
(France) Army of Sambre-et-Meuse	(Habsburg monarchy) Army of the Lower Rhine

Strength
48,000	64,000

Casualties and losses
Wetzlar: 500, 7 guns Uckerath: 3,000	Wetzlar: 400; Uckerath: 600

The Battle of Wetzlar (15 June 1796) saw a Habsburg Austrian army led by Archduke Charles, Duke of Teschen launch an attack on a Republican French army under Jean-Baptiste Jourdan in its defenses on the Lahn River. The War of the First Coalition action ended in an Austrian victory when most of the French army began retreating to the west bank of the Rhine River. On the 19th the combat of Uckerath was fought as the Austrians pursued the French left wing. Wetzlar is located in the state of Hesse in Germany a distance of 66 kilometres (41 mi) north of Frankfurt.

In the Rhine Campaign of 1796, Jourdan's Army of Sambre-et-Meuse won a foothold on the east bank of the Rhine after defeating its opponents at Altenkirchen on 4 June. This was part of a plan to lure Archduke Charles to the north so that the Army of Rhin-et-Moselle under Jean Victor Marie Moreau could breach the Rhine defenses in the south. The strategy worked as designed. When Charles came north with heavy forces to drive back Jourdan, Moreau successfully mounted an assault crossing of the Rhine at Kehl near Strasbourg.
