= François Laroche =

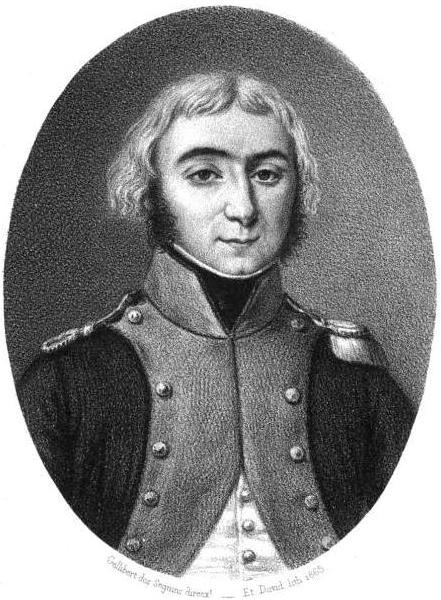
- Born: 5 January 1775; Ruffec, Angoumois
- Died: 22 February 1823 (aged 48) Ruffec, Charente
- Allegiance: France
- Branch: Cavalry. Carabiniers. French Army
- Service years: 1791–1816
- Rank: Général de division
- Conflicts: French Revolutionary Wars; Napoleonic Wars

François Laroche (5 January 1775 – 22 February 1823) was a French general who served during the Revolutionary and Napoleonic wars. Born in Ruffec (Angoumois), Laroche rose through the ranks due to his skill and bravery on the battlefield.

== Biography ==
Laroche began his military service on 1 December 1791 as a lieutenant in the grenadier battalion of the Charente volunteers. Between 1792 and 1793, he served with the Armies of the North and Sambre-et-Meuse. Promoted to lieutenant on 1 April 1793 and captain on 12 February of the same year, Laroche demonstrated exceptional leadership at the Battle of Arlon, leading a decisive charge against an Austrian cavalry regiment, capturing two guns, and routing the enemy

After 5 January 1798, he resumed his duties in the infantry, continuing his service Army of the Danube from 20 April 1799. In 1800, he participated in campaigns with the Army of the Rhine.

In 1803, Laroche joined the Imperial Guard as a captain of the horse grenadiers and fought at the Battle of Austerlitz in 1805. Serving under Michel Ordener as captain of the second squadron, second company, Laroche distinguished himself during the campaign.

Following Austerlitz, Napoleon appointed his brother-in-law, Prince Camille Borghèse, as the chef of the First Carabiniers. Lacking military experience, Borghèse relied heavily on Laroche, who had been promoted to major and was effectively in command. Borghèse’s neglect of his duties—he was notably absent during an inspection at Elbing on 8 May 1807—eventually led to Laroche’s promotion to colonel and official command of the regiment.

The First Carabiniers were not present at Eylau, having been ordered late to follow the main body of the French Army, and then being ordered to hold a few miles away from the battlefield itself. The French casualties there were great, almost impossible to estimate. The regiment later marched past the frozen corpses of horses and men on the battle field. They caught up with the rest of the French Army in time to participate at Heilsberg, and later at Friedland. He was wounded by a sword blow to the head in combat at Ratisbon on 23 April 1809; subsequently, on 6 July, at the Battle of Wagram, commanding 1st Carabinier Regiment of Bessières's cavalry reserve, his horse was killed under him.

He served in 1812 in French invasion of Russia, and in the campaign in Saxony in 1813. He was appointed brigadier general on September 28 of that year; in October, he commanded a brigade in Hanau, (Note: The Order of Battle does not specify which troops; it is likely that he commanded one of the 1st Carabiniers-à-Cheval.) And after the abdication of the Emperor, the Restored Bourbons gave him command of the Department of Charente on 23 July 1814. He entered inactive duty on 1 February 1816, and retired on April 1, 1820. General Laroche died in Ruffec (Charente) on 22 February 1823.

== Honors ==
- Officer of the Legion of Honor on 14 March 1806.
- Baron of the Empire.
- Knight of Order of Saint Louis on 29 July 1814.
