= Jean-Baptiste de Bressoles de Sisce =

French brigadier general

Jean-Baptiste de Bressolles de Sisce (French pronunciation: [ʒɑ̃ batist də bʁɛsɔl də sis]; 23 December 1753, in Auvillar – 30 November 1838, at Auvillar), was a French brigadier general who served in the French Revolutionary Wars and the Napoleonic Wars. He retired from active military service on 1 October 1811 as Marechal de camp. His wife, Marie-Sophie-Theophile De Boscq, survived him.

== Ranks ==
- 25 May 1783: Captain.
- 21 August 1792: Lieutenant colonel.
- 9 July 1793: Brigadier, provisionally.
- 14 June 1794: General of brigade.
- 14 June 1804: Legion of Honour: Commander.
- 23 October 1811: Mareschal de camp.

== Assignments ==
- 7 September 1793 – 30 December 1795: assigned to the Army of the Rhine.
- 30 December 1795 – 3 May 1798: assigned to the Army of the Rhine and Moselle army.
- 3 May 1798 – 16 August 1799: assigned to the military division.
- 16 August 1799 – 8 October 1799: assigned to the Army of England.
- 8 October 1799 – September 1800: commander in La Rochelle.
- September 1800 – 20 February 1801: commander in Belle-Isle-en-Mer.
- 20 February 1801: unassigned during military reform (first amalgamation).
- 29 March 1801 – March 1808: commander of the department of Gard.
- 3 August 1809 – 28 July 1809: commandant the military division.
- 28 July 1809 – 23 October 1811: assigned to the military division.
- 23 October 1811: retirement.
