= Maurice Frimont =

Maurice Frimont, born 14 December 1747 in Gondreville (Meurthe-et-Moselle), youngest child of Dominique Frimont, a laborer at Gondreville, and Catherine Laurent, was a general of the French Revolutionary Wars and, later Napoleonic Wars.

== Military service ==
- 18 March 18, 1764 King's Dragoon Regiment,
- 11 November 1768 Brigade of the Company of the Holy Cross
- 20 November 1776 Chasseurs à Cheval
- 20 March 1779 Squadron of Valencia, 1st Regiment of Chasseurs à Cheval
- 24 September 1784 Warrant (officer) Chasseurs à Cheval
- 14 May 1786 lieutenant in the same regiment May 14, 1786;
- 6 March 1788, second lieutenant in the Royal Regiment Liège
- 11 June 1788, second captain in the 12th Infantry Battalion
- 8 October 1793, assistant adjutants general to the Rhine army

He was promoted to Brigadier General on provisional battlefield on 26 November 1793 by order of representatives on missions from Lacoste and Baudot. On 24 June 1794 he received a letter of patent commission as a National Veteran, qualifying for public assistance, which documented 30 years of effective service. On 27 November 1794, he was confirmed in the rank of brigadier general. Subsequently, he participated in the campaigns of 1795 and 1796 as part of the Army of the Rhine and Moselle; he commanded one of the two brigades–16th Demi-brigade infantry de légère (3 battalions), 50th Demi-brigade infantry de ligne (3 battalions), and 7th Regiment Hussars (4 squadrons)–under Delmas. He was discharged on 13 February 1797 after more than 32 years of service. During the military reform of 1794 he was responsible for the general inspection of the filing of returns in Lunéville.

He married in 1797 to Amélie Suzanne Marie Christine Wilhelmine Neuwinger, who divorced him. On 17 August 1801 in Lunéville, he married Catherine Magnier, who gave him a daughter, Melanie. He died on 1 September 1811 in Lunéville.
