= Duke Ferdinand Frederick Augustus of Württemberg =

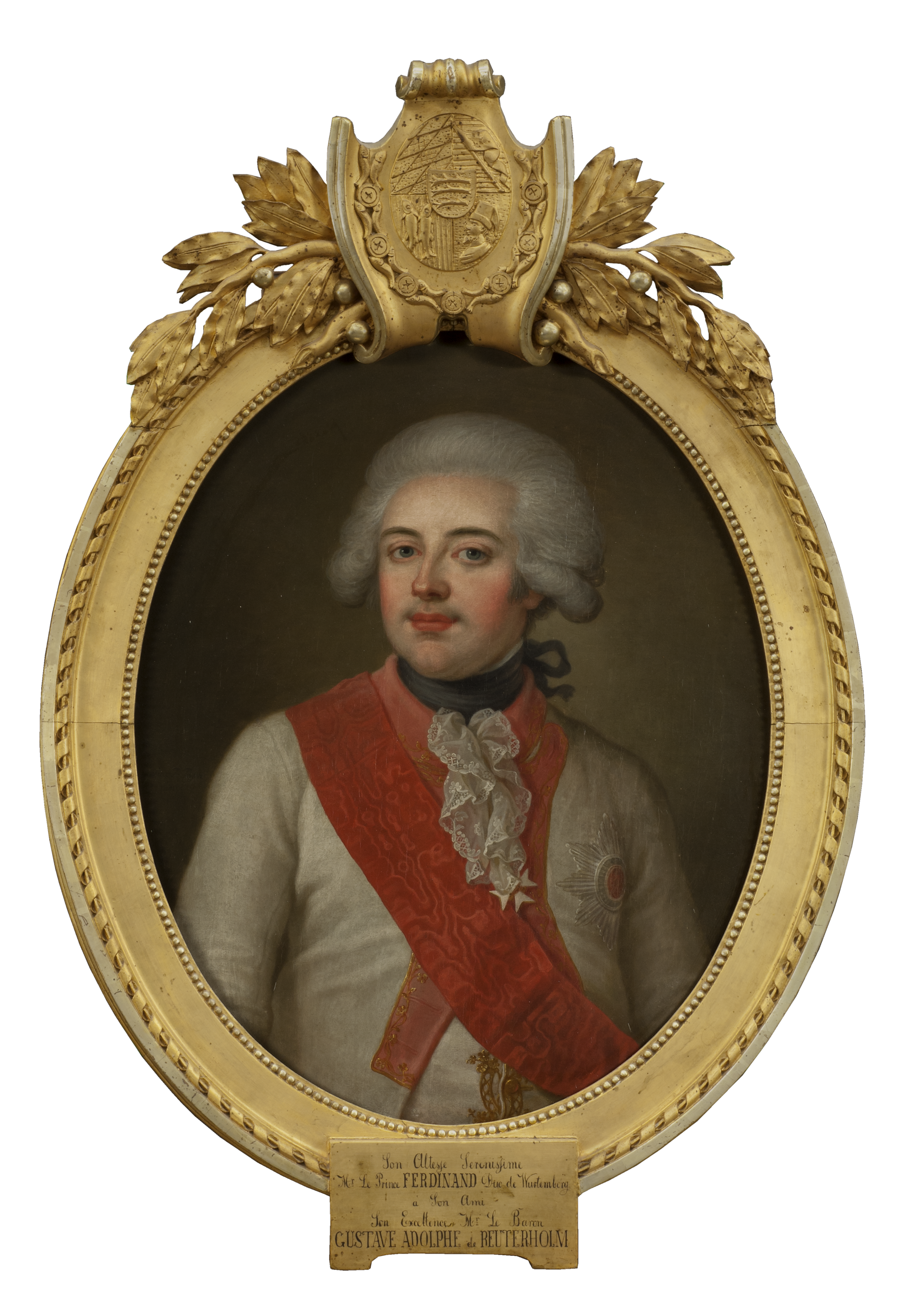
- Born: 22 October 1763; Treptow an der Rega, modern day Poland
- Died: 20 January 1834 (aged 70) Wiesbaden, Germany
- Allegiance: (Habsburg monarchy) Habsburg Austria; Austrian Empire
- Branch: Infantry
- Rank: Feldmarschall
- Conflicts: Austro-Turkish War (1787–91); Siege of Belgrade (1789); War of the First Coalition; Battle of Neerwinden (1793); Siege of Condé (1793); Battle of Altenkirchen (1796)
- Awards: Military Order of Maria Theresa, CC 1793, GC 1794; Order of Leopold, 1809/10; Order of St. Stephen, 1831
- Other work: Inhaber Infantry Regiment Nr. 38; Inhaber Infantry Regiment Nr. 40

Duke Ferdinand Frederick Augustus of Württemberg (22 October 1763 – 20 January 1834) was a Habsburg Austrian general during the French Revolutionary Wars and Napoleonic Wars.

== Early life ==
He was born into the House of Württemberg as the fifth son of Frederick II Eugene, Duke of Württemberg and his wife, Princess Friederike of Brandenburg-Schwedt, niece of Frederick the Great.

== Military career ==
As a high-ranking nobleman, he started his military career as an Oberstleutnant in 1781. Promoted to General-major in 1788, he fought at Belgrade during the Austro-Turkish War. During the War of the First Coalition he led his troops at Neerwinden and was in command of the successful Siege of Condé in 1793.

In March 1796 Württemberg was promoted to Feldzeugmeister, but after he was defeated by the French at Altenkirchen that June, Archduke Charles, Duke of Teschen removed him from command. He was promoted to Feldmarschall in 1805 but for the remainder of his military career he held commands in the interior. He was Proprietor (Inhaber) of one Austrian infantry regiment from 1785 to 1809, then a second infantry regiment from 1809 until his death in 1834. His eldest brother became King Frederick I of Württemberg and a younger brother Duke Alexander of Württemberg was a general officer in the service of the Russian Empire.

== Private life ==
On 18 March 1795 in Sondershausen he married Princess Albertine of Schwarzburg-Sondershausen (1771-1829), whom he divorced in 1801. On 23 February 1817 in Marseille he was married for the second time to Princess Pauline Kunigunde Waldburga of Metternich-Winneburg (1772-1855), elder sister of Austrian statesman and diplomat Klemens von Metternich. He didn't have children.

== Honours ==
- Württemberg:
  - Grand Cross of the Order of the Württemberg Crown
  - Commander of the Military Merit Order; Grand Cross
- Austrian Empire:
  - Commander of the Military Order of Maria Theresa, 1793; Grand Cross, 1794
  - Grand Cross of the Imperial Order of Leopold, 1809/10
  - Grand Cross of the Order of St. Stephen, 1831
- Kingdom of Prussia: Knight of the Order of the Black Eagle, 24 September 1831

== Ancestry ==
Ancestors of Duke Ferdinand Frederick Augustus of Württemberg

16. Eberhard III, Duke of Württemberg
8. Frederick Charles, Duke of Württemberg-Winnental
17. Wild- and Rhinegravine Anna Dorothea of Salm-Kyrburg
4. Charles Alexander, Duke of Württemberg
18. Albert II, Margrave of Brandenburg-Ansbach
9. Princess Eleonore Juliane of Brandenburg-Ansbach
19. Countess Sophie Margarete of Oettingen-Oettingen
2. Frederick II Eugene, Duke of Württemberg
20. Eugen Alexander Franz, Prince of Thurn and Taxis
10. Anselm Franz, Prince of Thurn and Taxis
21. Princess Anna Adelheid of Fürstenberg
5. Princess Marie Auguste of Thurn and Taxis
22. Ferdinand August, Prince of Lobkowicz
11. Princess Maria Ludowika of Lobkowicz
23. Princess Maria Anna of Baden-Baden
1. Duke Ferdinand Frederick August of Württemberg
24. Frederick William, Elector of Brandenburg
12. Philip William, Margrave of Brandenburg-Schwedt
25. Princess Dorothea of Schleswig-Holstein-Sonderburg-Glücksburg
6. Frederick William, Margrave of Brandenburg-Schwedt
26. John George II, Prince of Anhalt-Dessau
13. Princess Johanna Charlotte of Anhalt-Dessau
27. Henriette Catherine of Nassau-Orange
3. Princess Friederike of Brandenburg-Schwedt
28. Frederick I of Prussia
14. Frederick William I of Prussia
29. Princess Sophia Charlotte of Hanover
7. Princess Sophia Dorothea of Prussia
30. George I of Great Britain
15. Princess Sophia Dorothea of Hanover
31. Princess Sophia Dorothea of Celle

== Notes ==
Military offices
Preceded by Franz Wenzel, Graf von Kaunitz-Rietberg	Proprietor (Inhaber) of Infantry Regiment Nr. 38; 1785–1809	Succeeded by disbanded
Military offices
Preceded by Joseph Anton Franz Mittrowsky	Proprietor (Inhaber) of Infantry Regiment Nr. 40; 1809–1834	Succeeded by unknown
