= Jean-Marie Forest =

Jean-Marie Forest (4 February 1752 in Lyon (Rhone) – 12 June 1799 in Modena) was a French general of the French Revolutionary Wars.

== Service record ==
Forest entered service on 31 August 1768 in Custine's Dragoon Regiment (the future 2nd Cavalry Regiment); he became brigadier 17 September 1777, quartermaster 15 April 1783, and Warrant Officer 1 October 1784. On 1 May 1788 he was a sous-lieutenant, lieutenant on 15 September 1791, and captain on 15 September 1792. He served in that capacity in the campaigns of 1792–1793 at the Army of the Rhine, and was appointed squadron leader on 12 October 1793.

He was provisionally promoted to brigadier general pm 11 June 1794, the promotion becoming permanent on 29 November 1794. He campaigned from 1794 to 1796, the armies of the Rhine and the of the Rhine and Moseelle. There he commanded the reserves, two brigades of cavalry and a brigade of mixed infantry, under overall command of François Antoine Louis Bourcier. He retired at the conclusion of that campaign in 1797 but on 4 May 1798, he was recalled to service and sent to northern Italy, where he commanded a cavalry brigade under Jean-Étienne Championnet. He was distinguished by his bravery at the head of the 7th and 25th regiments of curaissiers in battle on December 15, 1798, and the next night he repulsed an attempted surprise attack by the enemy on the door St. John Lateran in Rome.

On 25 February 1799 he led a saber charge at the San Severo. He died on 12 June 1799, at the Battle of Modena.
