= Mack Walker =

American historian (1929–2021)

- Born: June 6, 1929; Springfield, Massachusetts, U.S.
- Died: February 10, 2021 (aged 91)
- Education: Bowdoin College
- Occupation: Historian
- Known for: German Home Towns and other books
- Title: Professor Emeritus, Johns Hopkins University

Mack Walker (June 6, 1929 – February 10, 2021) was an American historian of German intellectual history.

== Life and career ==
Born near Springfield, Massachusetts, in 1929, he had formative experiences when he was stationed with the U.S. military in Bavaria and Württemberg in the early 1950s. He studied at Bowdoin College.

He began teaching German history in the 1950s, and had an interest in German intellectual history of the late 17th and early 18th centuries. Walker began teaching at Johns Hopkins University in 1974 and retired in June 1999. He published several books on German history, including the influential German Home Towns (1971), in which he examined the nature of small-town life in Early Modern Germany. He was a recipient of a Guggenheim Fellowship and awards from the National Endowment for the Humanities.

Walker died from COVID-19 on February 10, 2021, at age 91.

== Principle publications ==
- German Home Towns: Community, State and General Estate 1648–1871. Cornell University Press; Reprint edition (June 18, 1998). ISBN 978-0801485084
- The Salzburg Transaction: Expulsion and Redemption in Eighteenth Century Germany. Cornell University Press; 1 edition (1992). ISBN 978-0801427770
- Johann Jakob Moser and the Holy Roman Empire of the German Nation. The University of North Carolina Press; 1 edition (January 1, 1981). ISBN 978-0807814413
- Germany and the Emigration, 1816–1885. Harvard University Press; 1 edition (1964). ISBN 978-0674353008
