= Charles Antoine Xaintrailles =

Charles Antoine Dominique Xaintrailles
- Born: 17 January 1769; Wesel, Kingdom of Prussia
- Died: 13 May 1833 (aged 64) Paris, France
- Allegiance: Kingdom of France; Kingdom of France; French Republic
- Branch: artillery
- Service years: 1779–1783;1792–1803; 1814–1814.
- Rank: general of division

Charles Antoine Dominique Xaintrailles, also called Anointe-Charles-Dominique de Lauthier de Chabanon Xaintrailles, (17 January 1769–1833) was a general in the French Revolutionary and Napoleonic wars.

As a young man, he fought in the West Indies; upon the dissolution of his regiment, he served as a mercenary in several armies of northern Europe. While in Nassau, he developed a liaison with Marie-Henriette Heinikein, of Berlin, who joined him on his travels as his aide de camp. He returned to French service in 1792, and served in several campaigns on the Rhine, and in Switzerland. He avoided execution in 1793, when charged with treason and misconduct by the representatives on mission.

In Switzerland in 1799, he suppressed the Valais uprising and captured the Valais border posts with northern Italy. Placed on trial a second time, this for peculation, he again faced a courts-martial, in which he was acquitted. He retired from the army in 1804, but returned briefly in 1813. He was taken prisoner at the Battle of Leipzig, and died in 1833 in poverty.

== Early military service ==
Charles-Antoine-Dominique was born in Wesel, in the Kingdom of Prussia, the birthplace of his mother Claire Catherine Biben. His father, Lauthier de Chabanon, was an officer in the French army and reported by most sources as an aide to the Marshal of Armentieres, and either a count or an earl. His father was probably Dominique-Nicholas Lauthier, the commandant at Sarrebourg (1738–1742) (M. le Chevalier Lauthier de Chabanon) in Louis XV's service, who was awarded pensions totaling 1,000 livres, upon his retirement, as former captain of Strasbourg militia battalion and as former captain of grenadiers of the provincial artillery regiment of Strasbourg. (Note: Dominique-Nicholas Lauthier (seiur de) former commandant of Sarrebourg (aged 63) received a pension of 300 livres in 1765; this was enhanced by the National Assembly in 1791. Archives parlementaires de 1787 à 1860: recueil complet des débats législatifs et politiques des chambres françaises, Paris, 1882, p. 478.)

In 1779, Charles-Antoine-Dominique joined the Royal Artillery Corps. In 1782, as part of the Regiment de La Mark, he embarked for the West Indies. His unit was disbanded in May 1783, and, as a mercenary, he engaged as a simple gunner under the name of Lauthier in the Nassau Legion. He left this post for service in the Regiment de Penthièvre. In 1789, he took a commission in the 2nd regiment of artillery in service of the United Provinces.

While serving in the German states, he developed a liaison with Marie-Henriette Heinikein, originally of Berlin, in Prussia. The lady adopted the title Madame Xaintrailes in the hope of convincing Xaintrailles to marry her. They lived together in Germany for a while, but in 1791, he had to declare himself either a citizen of France or not. He returned to Paris in November of that year.

In 1792 he regained his commission at the onset of the War of the First Coalition, as a brevet captain in the 6th battalion of infantry légère, in the Army of the Rhine. Henriette Heinikein, now calling herself Madame Xaintrailles, joined him as an adjutant. She followed him to Neukirch (June 1792), Hüningen (August 1792) and Wissembourg (1793). He was promoted to brigadier 8 March 1793 and as marechal de camp, Xaintrailles was stationed with the army of the Rhine, with Henriette as his aide de camp. In August 1793, the representatives on mission Bories, Ruamps and Milhaud charged him with malfeasance, leading to his suspension.

Once cleared, in 1794, Xaintrailles was assigned to the body of the Army of the Rhine detached to Blieskastel, Homburg and Kaiserslautern. He was given a brigade of about 3,000 soldiers and assigned to hold Homburg. This force consisted of the 2nd Côtes-du-Nord, 4th Saône-et-Loire, 7th Haute-Saône and 8th Ain Volunteer Battalions. In 1795 he commanded a brigade of the Army of the Rhine and Moselle. On 30 May 1796, he was promoted to major general. During the Rhine Campaign of 1796, he commanded a division in the same army, under overall command of Jean Victor Moreau. His division was part of the center of the army, under the command of General Louis Desaix and included 4,800 infantry and 960 cavalry distributed into two Demi-brigades d'ligne, and two regiments of riflemen and two cavalry regiments. He participated in the battles of Maudach on 15 June and Renchen on 28 June.

== Campaign in Switzerland ==
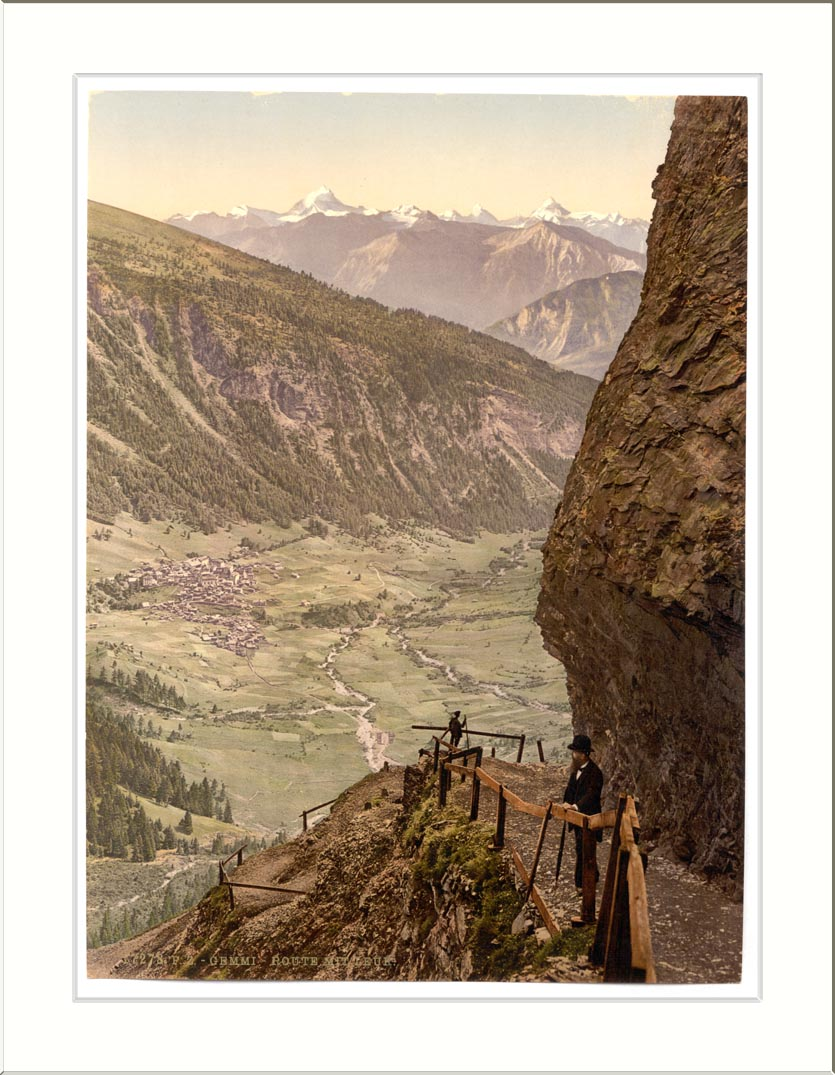
The mountains made traveling with artillery and supplies almost impossible.

In 1799, he commanded a division of the French Army of Helvetia in Switzerland under Massena's command. At the outbreak of the campaign, he covered the left wing, with responsibility for the invasion of the Grisons, with two brigades under command of Nicolas Oudinot and Ruby. This wing was to maintain communication with the Army of the Danube via Ruby's brigade, which stood at the farthest left, in the vicinity of Schaffhausen. Throughout that summer, he was instructed to observe (and report) all Austrian movements near along the Rhine and Lake Constance. As the Austrian army, 30,000 men in the Tyrol, 28,000 on the line between Vorarlberg to Bregenz, and 40,000 around Lake Constance, threatened all French communication and the best lines of retreat. Ruby's brigade by Schaffhausen was the best, and sole, protection for any retreat, if necessary. By April Massena had prepared his plans, and reorganized his nine divisions into four corps. Xaintrailles covered the left wing, with the divisions of Souham and Legrand, 18,000 men in all. This wing spread in the direction of the Rhine, where Souham's force covered Frickthal and Basel, between the Aare and Hüningen, and Legrand's brigade held Altbreisach and Kehl, and observed the debouches from the Black Forest. A division of heavy cavalry reserve also occupied Basel.

In addition, Massena sent Xaintrailles to Valais, with 6,000 men, where some of the inhabitants had mounted an insurgency against the republican forms adopted by the new Swiss government. Xaintrailles originally positioned himself in Solothurn, but Massena instructed him to proceed further south, to the heart of the insurgency. This placed him at the farthest right of the French line where he could defend the Simplon Pass and Great St Bernard Pass against Habsburg troops in northern Italy.

=== Valais insurgency ===
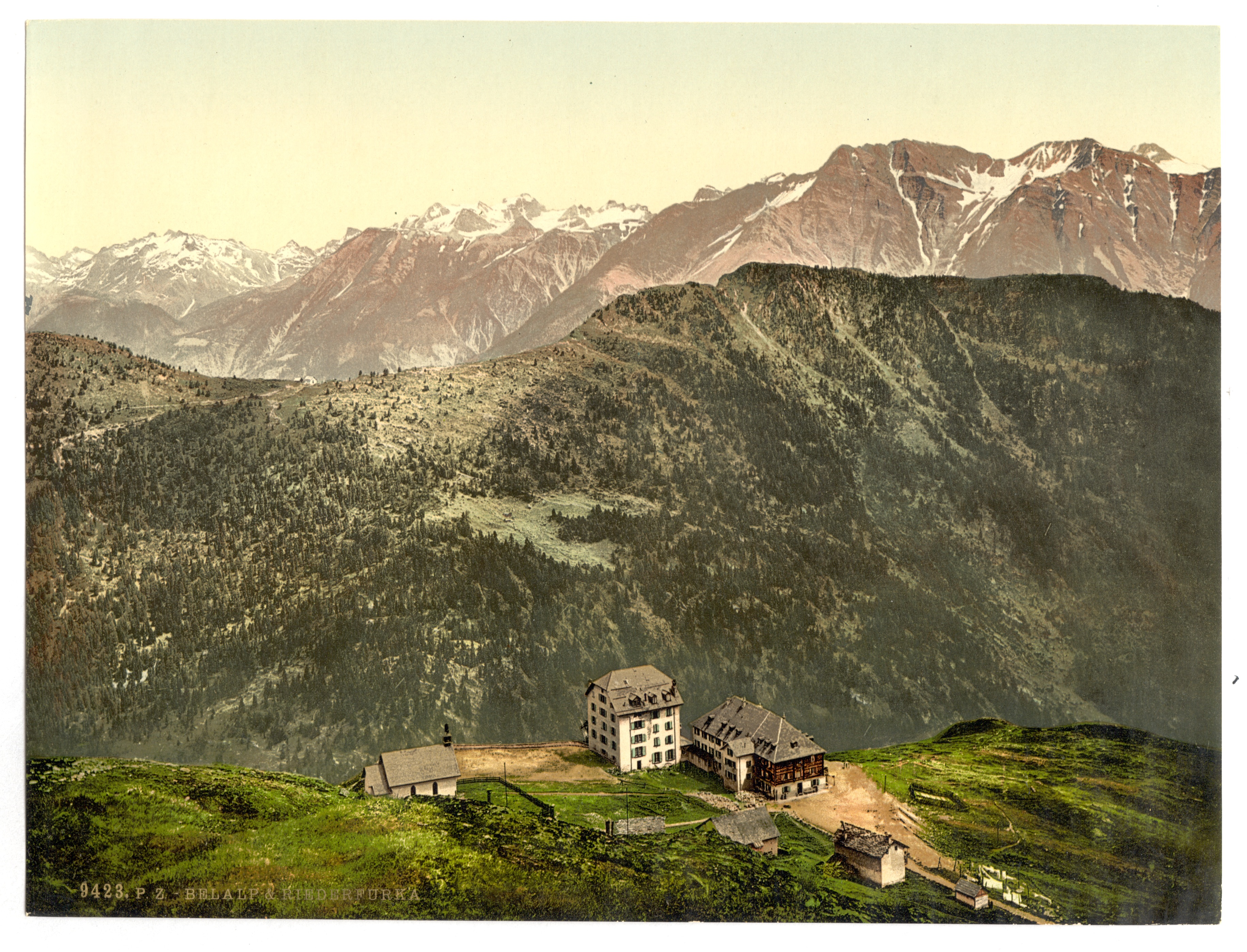
The steep hillsides and high mountains of Valais complicated fighting; the Valais insurgents knew how to use the countryside to their best advantage.

On 24 May 1799, several thousand insurgents, reinforced with French deserters, recruits from some of the minor cantons, some Austrian battalions, and emboldened with the news of approaching Russian forces, emerged from the wood at Finge and attacked Xaintrailles' encampment. The French beat them off and they withdrew to their own entrenchments. Before daybreak on the following morning (25 May), Xaintrailles attacked in two columns. The first, Column Barbier (three battalions and one squadron), drove the insurgents out of the woods and chased them to the Leuk. The second, the left column, including two battalions of the 89th and 110th as well as some of the grenadiers of those two demi-brigades, were under the personal command of Xaintrailles, and attacked the insurgent position at Leuk, defended by seven guns so carefully placed as to deliver enfilade fire on the passage of the valley; furthermore, the insurgents had placed sharpshooters on the approaches to the gorge. Xaintrailles sent two flanking detachments to the crest of the mountains, well out of artillery range, while the main body in the valley attacked the position in front of them. It received such a storm of musketry and canister fire at the foot of the entrenchments that it began to waver; at this point, a well-sustained fusilade from the crest of the mountains showered the insurgents' flanks. The men in the gorge redoubled their efforts and entered the Valais entrenchments, slaying some of the gunners at their positions. The survivors fled to Raron, abandoning their guns and magazines.

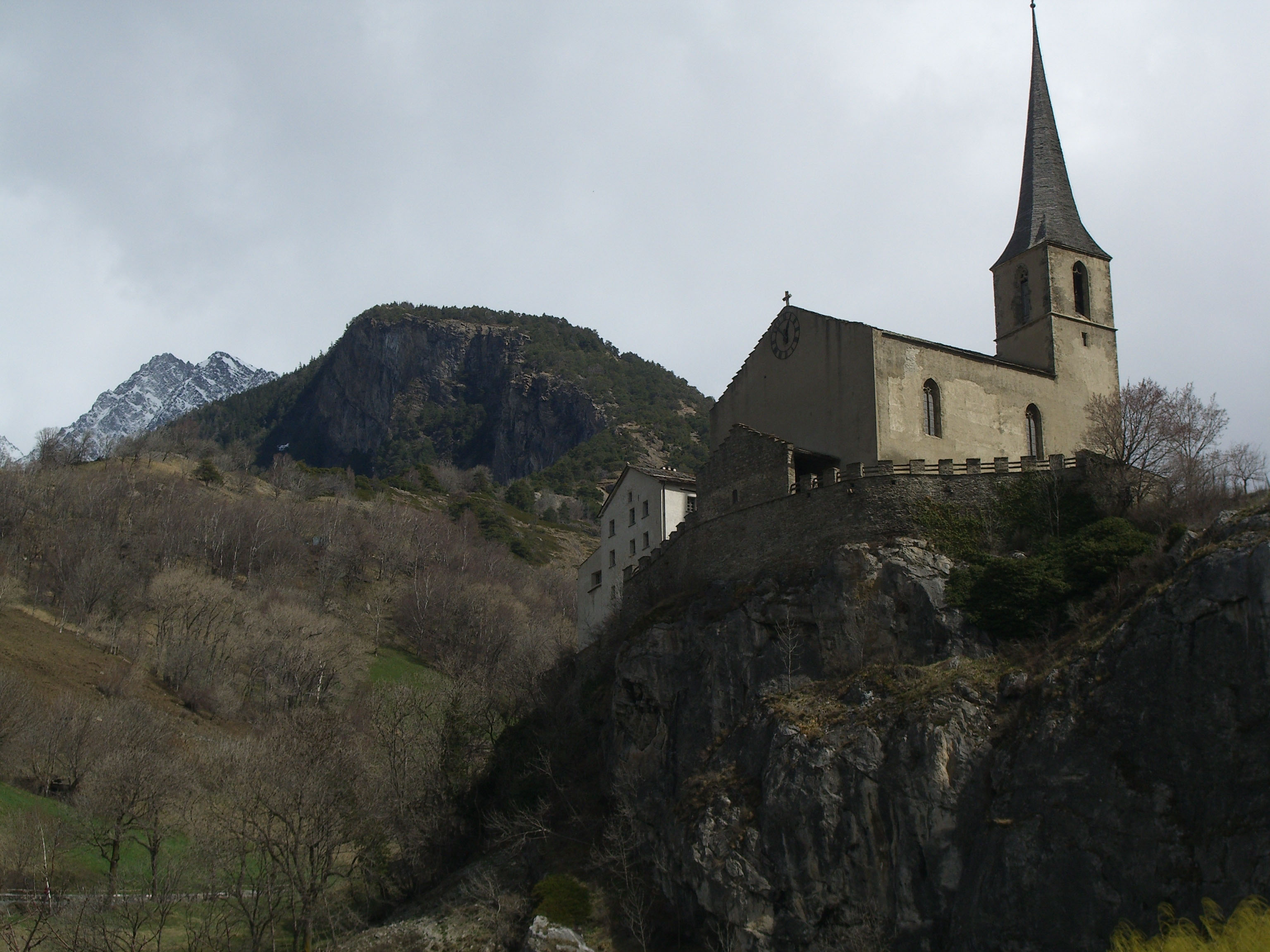
Once the insurgents retreated to the mountains above Raron, the terrain made dislodging them difficult. Xaintrailles sent his men to higher mountains to fire down on the insurgents, rousting them from their hiding places. By the end of the day, the insurgents had withdrawn deeper into the mountains, leaving only the Austrian battalions to hold the position.

On 26 May, Xaintrailles' right column crossed the Saltina river via a ford and marched to Brig, where some of the insurgents had rallied. These abandoned the town and fled into the mountains behind it. The left column, column Xaintrailles, reached Naters on the right bank of the Rhône and proceeded to Mörel and Lax, seeking to capture the bridge between Lax and Ernen, where the largest group of the insurgents had congregated. While he was reforming his troops, he offered the insurgents an olive branch: if they would lay down their arms and return to their homes, he promised an amnesty for the past. Those who persisted in revolt would face summary execution. A number of the insurgents did submit, but many withdrew to Lax where, reinforced by a couple of Austrian battalions, they rejected all offers of amnesty and placed their reliance on nature's formidable position. There followed a day-long battle with alternating results; eventually, the insurgents were routed, but the contest was maintained by those two Austrian battalions, who eventually abandoned the field as night fell, and light failed. Xaintrailles pushed on with the grenadiers of the 100th and sent several companies of the 100th to St. Bernard. His Swiss allies guarded the gorges and defiles behind him. He established his headquarters at Brig, from which he could control the passes at Great St. Bernard and Simplon and access to northern Italy, and awaited his instructions from Massena.

== Excesses ==
Xaintrailles was charged with excessive exactions on the population, according to Jean-de-Dieu Soult, who replaced him with Jean Victor Tharreau at the end of the summer. He was court-martialed for peculation, but acquitted 28 April 1801. He left military service in 1804. He was a functionairy in the departments of Doire and Sesia. He returned to the army in 1813, and was placed in charge of supply for the Bavarian Corps of Observation. He was captured at the Battle of Leipzig, but later allowed to return to France. In 1813, he was awarded a knighthood of the Legion of Honour. He died in abject penury in Paris in 1833.

Xaintrailles was famous during his career for employing his mistress as his aide; she dressed in a uniform reminiscent of whatever he wore, and followed him everywhere, but he was the first of her own many excesses. By 1799, Henriette Heinekein had moved on to a spectacular career in liaison with influential men: Louis Alexandre Berthier, 1st prince de Wagram, 1st duc de Valangin, 1st sovereign Prince of Neuchâtel; Jean-Gérard Lacuée, count of Cessac; Lazare Carnot, Comte Carnot; Charles-François Lebrun, duc de Plaisance, Chancellor of the Empire Bernard Germain de Lacépède; Joachim Murat, Marshal of France and Grand Admiral or Admiral of France, and others. Eventually, based on these she negotiated a pension from Napoleon Bonaparte because of her contributions to the cause of the empire.

== Notes and references ==
=== References ===
- Leon Hennet, Carnet de la sabretache: revue d'histoire militaire: rétrospective: Madame Xaintrailles, Paris, Sabretache, 1906
- Lawrence Shadwell, Mountain Warfare Illustrated by the Campaign of 1799 in Switzerland
