= Battle of Toulouse (1814) =

1814 battle of the campaign in south-west France

- Part of the campaign in south-west France
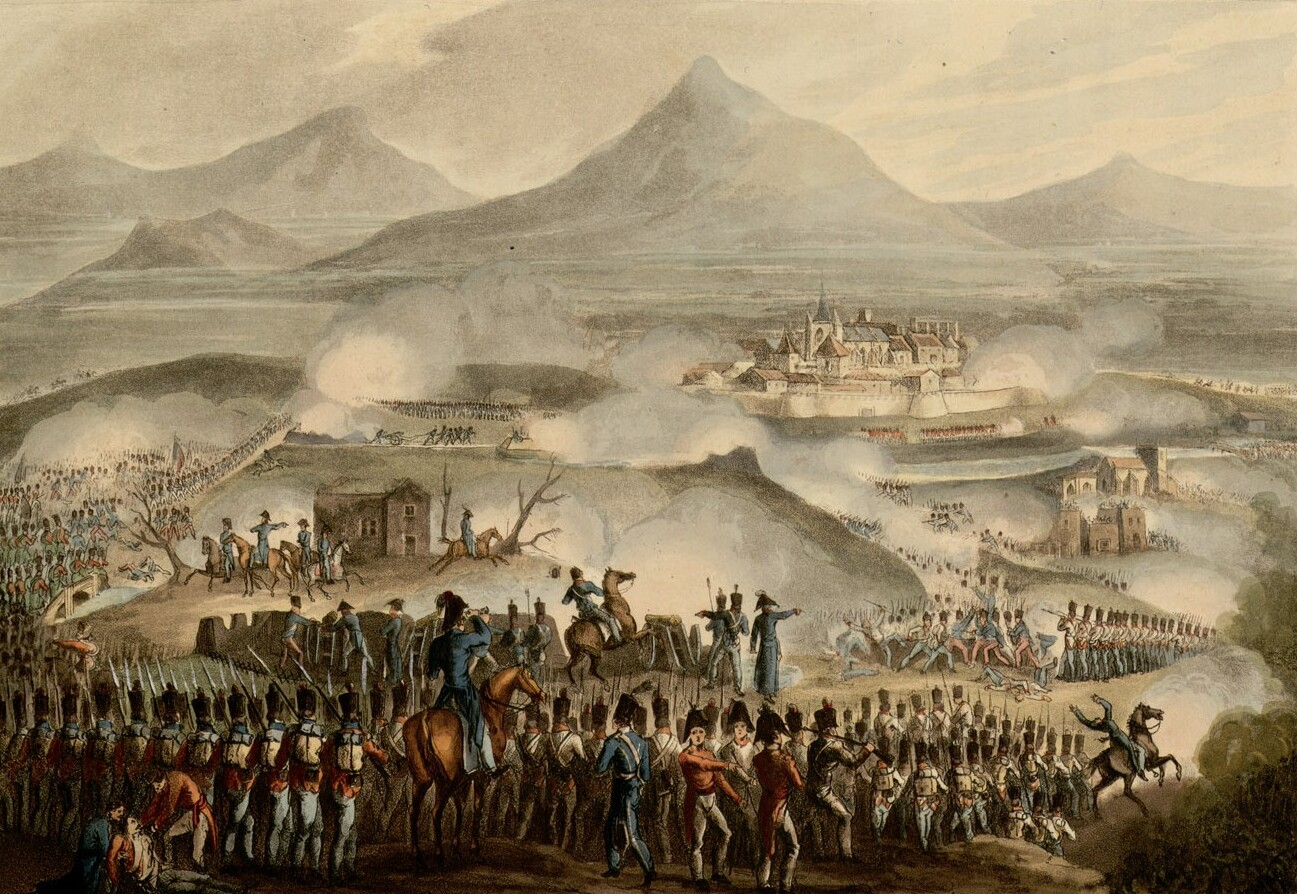
- 1814–1815 engraving of the battle
Date	10 April 1814
Location	Toulouse, Haute-Garonne 43.6044°N 1.4439°E
Result	See Commentary

Belligerents
United Kingdom; Spain; Portugal	France

Commanders and leaders
(United Kingdom of Great Britain and Ireland) Marquess of Wellington	(First French Empire) Jean-de-Dieu Soult

Strength
49,446; • 39,910; • 9,536 (Note: Freire's corps plus Morillo's division under R. Hill (see Battle of Toulouse order of battle § Anglo-allied army))	42,043

Casualties and losses
4,558 to 5,500; • ≥2,103; • ≥1,922; • ≥533	2,700 to 3,236

Peninsular War: Spain
current battle
Wellington in command
Wellington not in command

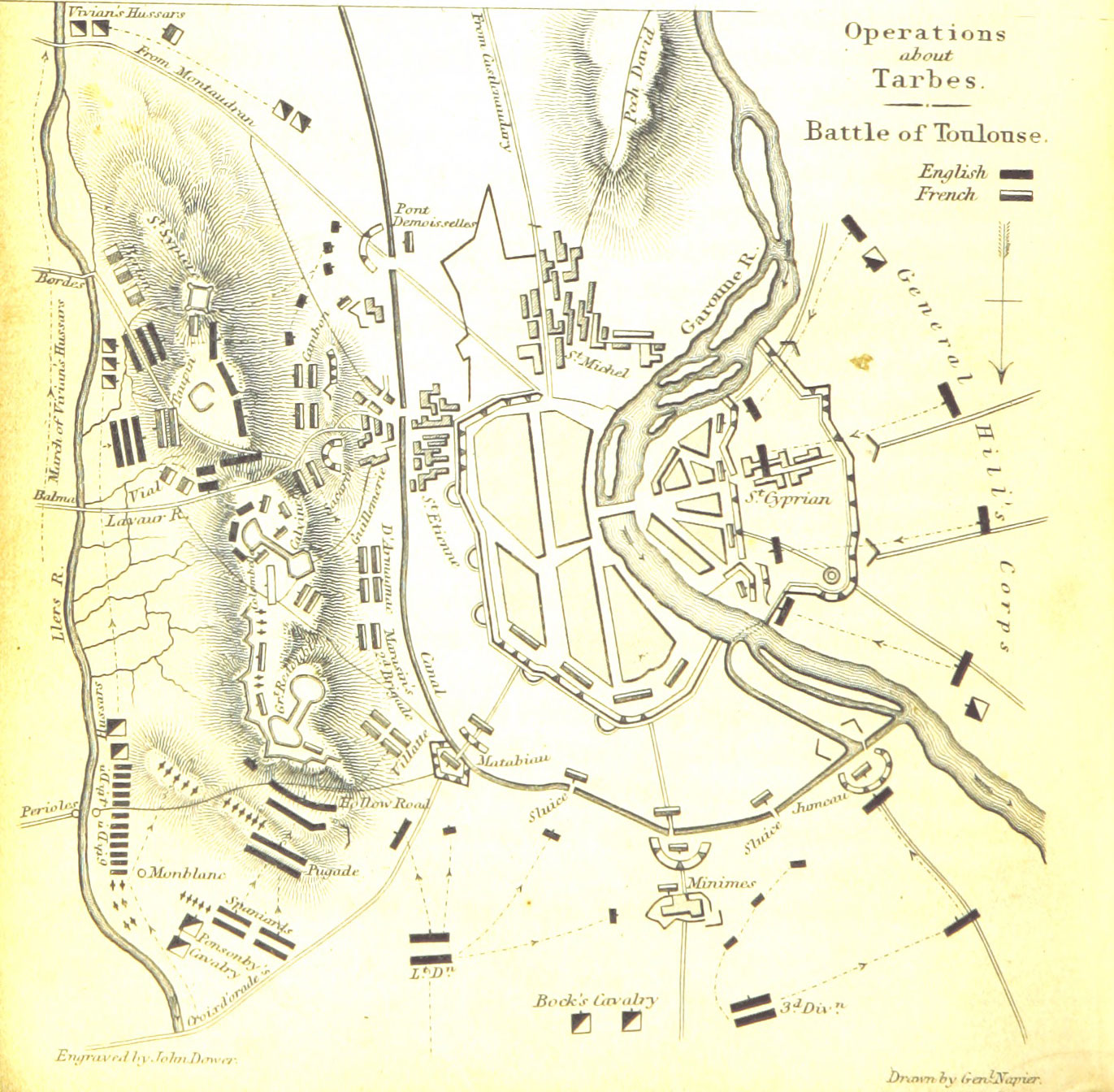
Map of the battle

The Battle of Toulouse took place on April 10, 1814, just four days after Napoleon's surrender of the French Empire to the Sixth Coalition, marking one of the final conflicts of the Napoleonic Wars. Having pushed the demoralised and disintegrating French Imperial Army out of Spain in a difficult campaign the previous autumn, the Allied British-Portuguese and Spanish army under Field Marshal Arthur Wellesley, 1st Marquess of Wellington pursued the war into southern France in the spring of 1814.

The city of Toulouse, the regional capital, put up a fierce resistance under the command of Marshal Soult, who tenaciously defended its fortified environs. The city fortifications themselves were not attacked. One British and two Spanish divisions were badly mauled in bloody fighting on 10 April, with Allied losses exceeding French casualties by almost 3,000, as per recent estimate. In the battle, Wellington's Spanish corps was led by Manuel Freire de Andrade, (Note: Battle of Toulouse order of battle) who had defeated Soult at the Battle of San Marcial last year. Freire's Spaniards were heavily engaged in the main assault and thus suffered heavy losses. Freire was unable to break through on his own, so Beresford's corps was thrown into the fray. Victory shifted back and forth in fierce combats as the Allies confidently tried to make their way through until, by the end of the day, the Anglo-Allied achievement was only to press back the French army at a certain distance in one sector of the battle; the Allies, nevertheless, were unable to break the French resistance there. On the other flank, Thomas Picton's Anglo-Portuguese forces (part of Wellington's own corps) were unable to push the French out of their position. The day after the battle at Toulouse, Soult retreated from that city, leaving behind 1,600 wounded soldiers including three generals.

Wellington's entry on the morning of 12 April was acclaimed by a great number of French Royalists, validating Soult's earlier fears of potential fifth column elements within the city. That afternoon, the official word of Napoleon's abdication and the end of the war reached Wellington. Soult agreed to an armistice on 17 April.

== Prelude ==
Following their successful invasion of France earlier in the year, an allied army of the Sixth Coalition, composed of British, Portuguese and Spanish troops under the supreme command of the Field Marshal Arthur Wellesley, 1st Marquess of Wellington, laid siege to the city of Toulouse, one of the few remaining urban centres in France still loyal to Napoleon.

The city of Toulouse was garrisoned by around 42,000 French troops, under the command of Marshal Jean-de-Dieu Soult, Duke of Dalmatia. Imperial forces across southern France were greatly demoralised by fighting the Anglo-Allied forces in their own country, and were further shaken by news of repeated Coalition victories in northern and eastern France. Allied campaigning had gradually pushed French forces out of Spain during 1813, after endless guerrilla wars which had resulted in more than 300,000 French casualties between 1808 and late 1813. The French suffered greater losses in manpower in southern France, as Napoleon diverted many southern forces to bolster his troops facing the Coalition armies invading northern and eastern France after an allied victory at Leipzig in October 1813.

== Preliminary operations ==
=== Orthez ===
After Soult's defeat by Wellington at the Battle of Orthez in late February 1814, the French Marshal retreated north behind the river Adour to Saint-Sever. Soult was on the horns of a dilemma. He could defend Bordeaux to the north-west or Toulouse to the east, but he could not protect both. The French army would have difficulty obtaining food near Bordeaux and it would place the river Garonne in their rear. Therefore, Soult elected to base himself on Toulouse.

=== Bordeaux ===
With Soult moving east, Wellington sent Beresford and two divisions to seize Bordeaux, the third-largest city of France. To make up for this subtraction of strength, the British general called up 8,000 Spanish infantry and the British heavy cavalry as reinforcements. Fearful that the Spanish would plunder the French countryside and incite a guerrilla war, Wellington put his allies on the British payroll and supply system. Meanwhile, the British-Portuguese-Spanish army pushed the French out of Aire-sur-l'Adour on 2 March in a skirmish. Soult pulled back to Plaisance and Maubourguet, facing west. A ten-day lull followed, during which time Wellington's reinforcements began to arrive.

On 12 March, Beresford captured Bordeaux without resistance. Leaving the 7th Division as a garrison, he rushed back to join Wellington with the 4th Division. Meanwhile, on 17–18 March, in a raid with 100 French cavalrymen, Captain Dauma circled the Allied army's south flank and attacked Saint-Sever where he captured 100 men. At the same time, Wellington launched his offensive, hoping to ensnare Soult's army. By rapidly marching east to Saint-Gaudens and north-east to Toulouse, the French avoided the British flanking columns. Reaching Toulouse, Soult placed his soldiers behind the city's walls and fortifications.

=== Initial moves ===
On 4 April, Wellington's engineers threw a pontoon bridge across the flooding Garonne north of the French city. After 19,000 Anglo-Allies crossed, the bridge gave way, trapping the men for three days. But Soult failed to take advantage of his opportunity to defeat Wellington's army in detail. On 8 April, in a fine charge, the British 18th Hussars under Lieutenant-colonel Sir Henry Murray seized the bridge at Croix d'Orade on the Hers. Meanwhile, on 7 April at midnight, the official couriers left Paris with news that Napoleon had abdicated and that the war was over.

=== French defences ===
Toulouse lies on the Garonne, which runs into the city from the south-west, then turns and exits to the north-west. Just east of the Garonne, the smaller Hers-Mort (Hers) (Note: Contemporary British sources call this river the "Ers", and this name is frequently used in secondary sources – see for example the map of the battle.) runs past the city from the south-east to the north-east, forming a narrow corridor. To attack the city from the north, Wellington's main force would have to cross to the east bank of the Garonne, then drive south-east down the corridor between the two rivers.

West of the Garonne lies the fortified suburb of St-Cyprien. Marshal Soult's defensive perimeter was anchored on the Languedoc Canal to the north, with three strategic bridgeheads at Ponts Jumeaux (northwest), Pont des Minimes (north) and Pont Matabiau (north-east). Each bridge was fortified with a robust redoubt, providing a defensive anchor. The Heights of Calvinet (also known as Mont Rave) situated east of the city and west of the Hers River, were fortified with multiple redoubts, forming a defensive stronghold. Marshal Soult's forces were deployed strategically across the city. One division held the suburb of St-Cyprien while another defended the canal line. Jean-Pierre Travot's conscripts manned the city walls, and Jean Darmagnac's division stood between the Heights and the canal. The divisions of Jean Isidore Harispe and Eugène-Casimir Vilatte defended the Heights, with Éloi Taupin's division in reserve. Meanwhile, Pierre Soult's cavalry screened the eastern and southern approaches. The battlefield, now urbanized, lies within the modern city of Toulouse.

== Battle ==
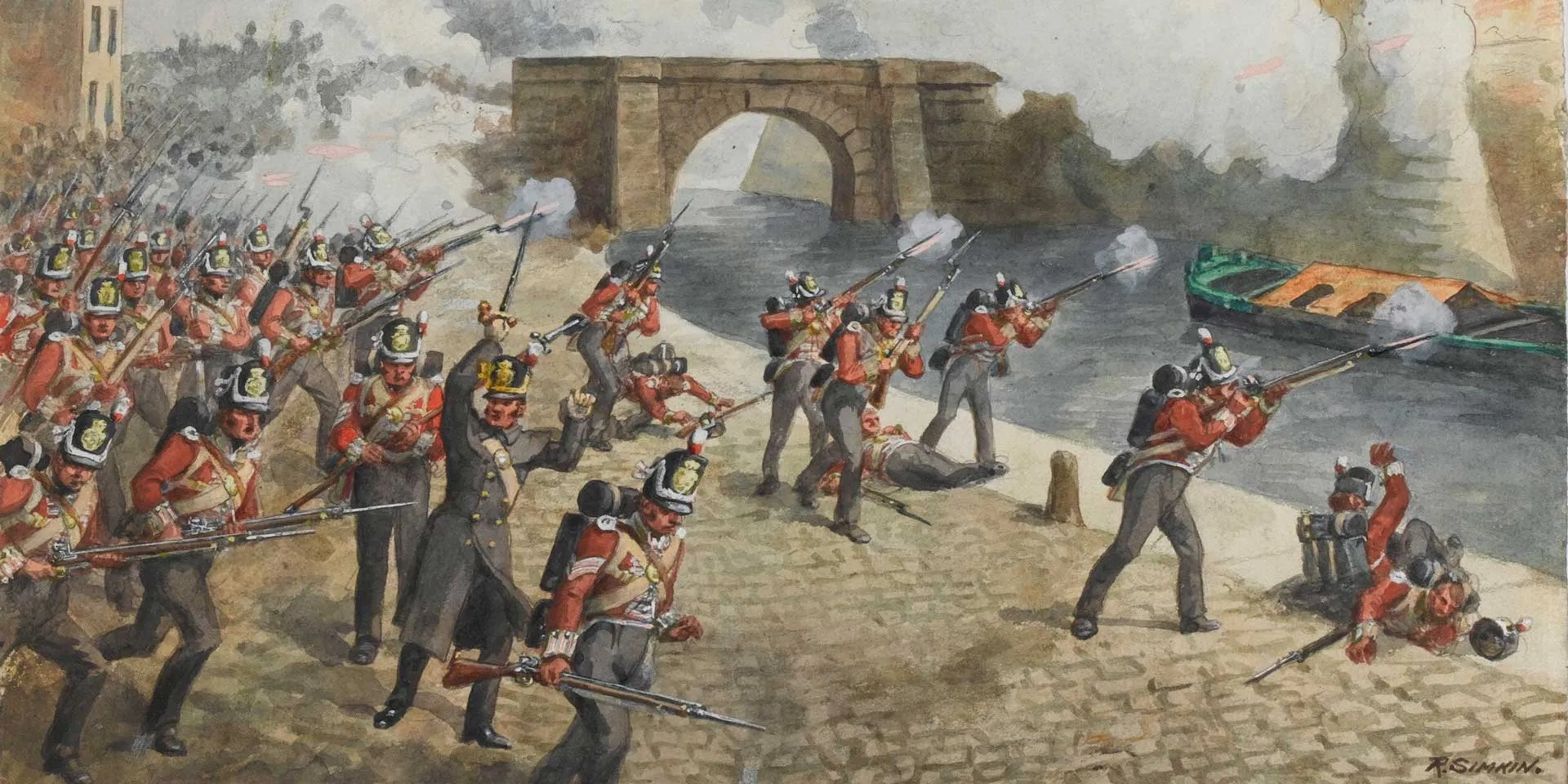
The 27th Foot at the battle

Wellington began his attack on Easter Sunday, 10 April. Hoping to divert some of Soult's forces, the British general sent Hill with the 12,600 men of the 2nd Division and Portuguese Division to attack St-Cyprien. The rest of the Anglo-Allied army (36,000) operated east of the Garonne and north of the city. The 3rd Division faced the north-west canal line with the Light Division to the east. Wellington planned to make his major effort against the Heights of Calvinet. Beresford would take the 4th and 6th Divisions and the Hussar brigades down the west bank of the Hers. Once he reached a point east of the city, Beresford would veer west and attack the Heights with the Hussars protecting his south flank. At the same time, Freire would assault the northern end of the Heights with his two Spanish divisions. Two heavy dragoon brigades waited in reserve.

=== Initial attacks ===
In the western sector, General Hill's troops successfully pushed back the French outposts, engaging in a relatively minor skirmish that resulted in approximately 80 casualties for his forces. Thomas Picton's Anglo-Portuguese division from Wellington's own corps was ordered to make feints against the fortified bridgehead at the Ponts Jumeaux. In accordance with some statements, the division began this operation later in the day when Picton heard the sounds of gunfire near the Heights.

Having thus easily cleared some of the outworks, Picton mounted an attack, a serious this time, on the Pont Jumeaux with his 3rd Division, and was repulsed with 300–400 casualties. "Thrice Picton renewed his assault, and thrice he was repelled." Meanwhile, Beresford's men encountered muddy fields and fell behind schedule. Unable to move his artillery, he ordered the cannons to take a position near the northern end of the Heights and open fire. Freire, thinking this was the signal for the combined attack, sent his men to assault the Heights. The Spanish infantry forged uphill and gained a momentary foothold in a road cut, but they were counter-attacked by a cloud of French skirmishers and soon sent fleeing. Covered by the Light Division and encouraged by Wellington himself, the Spanish foot soldiers rallied, then attacked and were defeated a second time.

=== Struggle for the heights ===
At last, Beresford's two Anglo-Portuguese divisions reached their jumping off positions, with the 6th Division leading. Pack's Brigade was still forming a line. A French division counter-attacked: the courageus but "insane" Divisional general Éloi Charlemagne Taupin led Rey's Brigade down in close column to the south, taking it out of the Sypière Redoubt. Having made this mistake, he gave the order to stop and deploy on the slope instead of attacking, just for an artillery British development of 1808 to meet his troops.—"A shower of Congreve rockets – new and unknown projectiles – at very close range threw the French into disorder; Rey's Brigade was routed and this, in turn, caused Gasquet's Brigade [which was nearly unengaged] to fall back in disorder" Thus, Rey was all-roundly exposed to deadly artillery fire and afterwards to an infantry attack covered by these rockets; due to this Taupin's tactical blunder he was easily driven uphill.

The Allied divisions began to advance up the slope and, without much opposition on the way to the top, captured the Sypière Redoubt for minutes as the French were withdrawing in panic. A powerful rocket fire strengthened with infantry support and by Taupin's tactical miscalculation—and the Anglo-Portuguese found themselves on high ground. Then they were fighting their way along the broken ground of the Heights while encountering bitter resistance. Swinging to the north, they began rolling up the French defences.

Acting with Freire's assistance, Beresford's men captured all two remaining redoubts, but lost them to a counterattack. The Spaniards, however, had already strongly exhausted their forces and were being challenged. More than once, Beresford's British fought their way into positions in and around the redoubts, and more than once the French infantry, cavalry and artillery knocked them back. The French raw conscripts were performing worse than their opponents. Due to the mistake of the British Colonel Robert Macara, the Allies were exposed to the deadly fire of French muskets and guns when Macara was maneuvering around the French positions. Picton continued his fruitless attacks on the Pont Jumeaux and the bridge of Minimes. Finally, the Allies seized one of the redoubts again after bringing the 4th Division forward: it was the Calvinet Redoubt the Anglo-Portuguese managed to take when its defender, General Jean Isidore Harispe, and Harispe's deputy, General Jean Baptiste Charles Baurot, fell seriously wounded; having lost their leaders, the discouraged French abandoned the redoubt to the British and forced to pull back to the knoll of Sacarin for defence. The hamlets of Bataille and Sacarin were on the reverse slope and part of the new French foothold. Soult meanwhile was able to hold only the Great Redoubt at the northern end in addition to some other footholds, but he did not decide to defend the redoubt and left it behind just as Beresford and Freire were preparing to assault it. The battle of Toulouse created more and more analogues with the Battle of Borodino two years before in Napoleon's Russian Campaign.

At nightfall the French divisions were still in occupation of the knoll of Sacarin and the broken ground that extended thence to the Pont des Demoiselles. The fighting continued until dusk, gradually becoming less fierce and dying down towards night. The Anglo-allies gained a foothold in the Calvinet area, whilst Picton's troops were still unsuccessful. Wellington, due to the depletion of ammunition as a result of the fierce resistance, could not build on the success achieved. Thus, the French army was pressed backwards, but not broken. That was the tactical outcome. Soult withdrew his soldiers who were on the Great Redoubt behind the city's adjacent fortifications, namely of the suburb of Saint-Étienne.

== Aftermath ==
Soult maintained control of Toulouse throughout the day on April 11, but upon observing Allied cavalry advancing along the Toulouse-Carcassonne road, he made the strategic decision to withdraw his forces from the city. At 9 pm that evening, the French withdrew out of Toulouse by the Carcassonne road.

On the morning of 12 April, a delegation of city officials handed over the city to the Allied army. That afternoon, Wellington got news via Bordeaux from Major-General Frederick Ponsonby of Emperor Napoleon's abdication. A few hours later in the evening, this was confirmed when the official couriers arrived from Paris. Wellington sent them on at once to Soult.

=== Casualties ===
The Allied army suffered from 4,558 to 5,500 casualties, including 1,900 from Freire's divisions and 1,500 from the 6th Division. Brigade commanders Denis Pack, James Douglas, and Thomas Brisbane were wounded. French casualties numbered 231 officers and 3,005 privates, including Taupin killed, or down to 2,700 Frenchmen were casualties.

=== Armistice ===
On 13 April, while on his march from Villefranche to Castelnaudary, the Marshal was caught up by the officers from Paris. They were met with a rebuff – Soult declared himself not convinced of the authenticity of their credentials. He stubbornly refused to recognize the provisional government until he had received what he considered conclusive proof of its legitimacy. Upon receiving Soult's refusal to recognize the Provisional Government, Wellington responded on April 14, stating that no armistice would be granted until Soult submitted to the new authority. Wellington's message implied that he suspected Soult of seeking to maintain control over his army for potential Napoleonic machinations. By 15 April, Marshal Suchet at Perpignan had accepted the evidence, placed himself at the disposition of the new government and asked Wellington for an armistice.

The last major action of the war occurred on 14 April at the Battle of Bayonne, when the French commander Thouvenot led a sortie from the besieged city against the Allied lines.

On 17 April, Soult at last received a dispatch from Berthier which formally announced the Emperor's abdication and consequent cessation of hostilities in all quarters. There was nothing more to be done and, the same day, his chief of staff went to Toulouse to sign an armistice, ending the fight in the south. The city was briefly placed under Coalition control during the summer of 1814, with the withdrawal of allied troops in September.

== Commentary ==
Both British and French historians claimed victory in the Battle of Toulouse, with differing perspectives on the outcome. British historian Fortescue does not give victory to either side. The French argued that they had achieved a strategic success, as Wellington failed to trap and defeat the French army, and Soult's intention was only to delay the British while planning to unite with Marshal Suchet's forces and launch a counterattack. From the French viewpoint, the capture of Toulouse was a hollow triumph, as their army remained intact despite ceding ground, and Wellington's forces suffered significant casualties and depleted their supplies. Soult retreated from Toulouse only after the British cavalry had made a detour on the road to Carcassonne; moreover, it advanced almost to the strategically vital bridge of Baziège. Carcassonne was the place where Soult hoped to join with Suchet. The British claimed victory because Toulouse ended up in their hands and the French were forced to give up ground, although only in one sector of the battle (the sector was the main one). In addition, the British took one gun on the heights and the French abandoned others when they left Toulouse (the taking or loss of guns being often taken by contemporaries as a sign of victory or defeat).

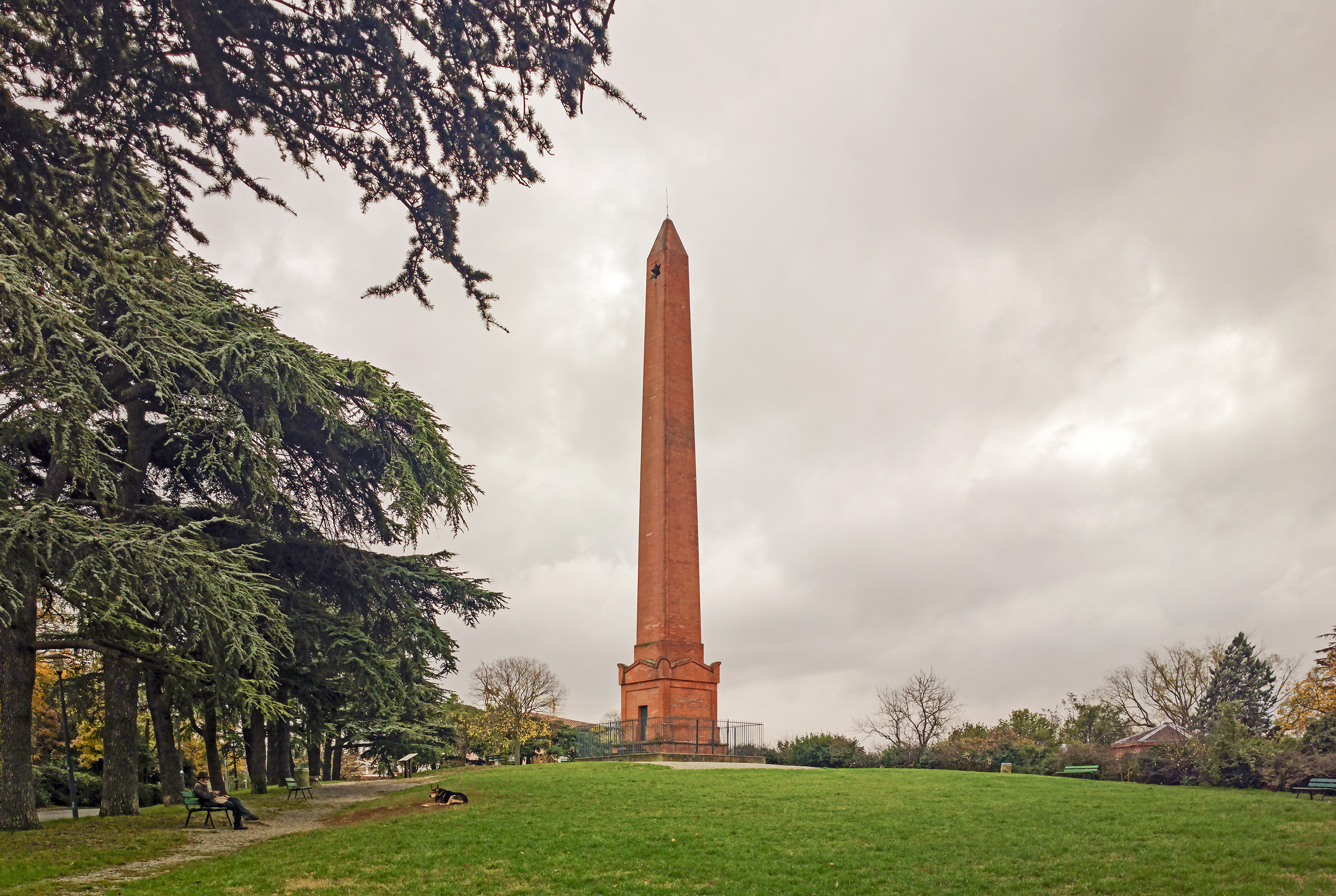
Monument commemorating the Battle of Toulouse (1814)

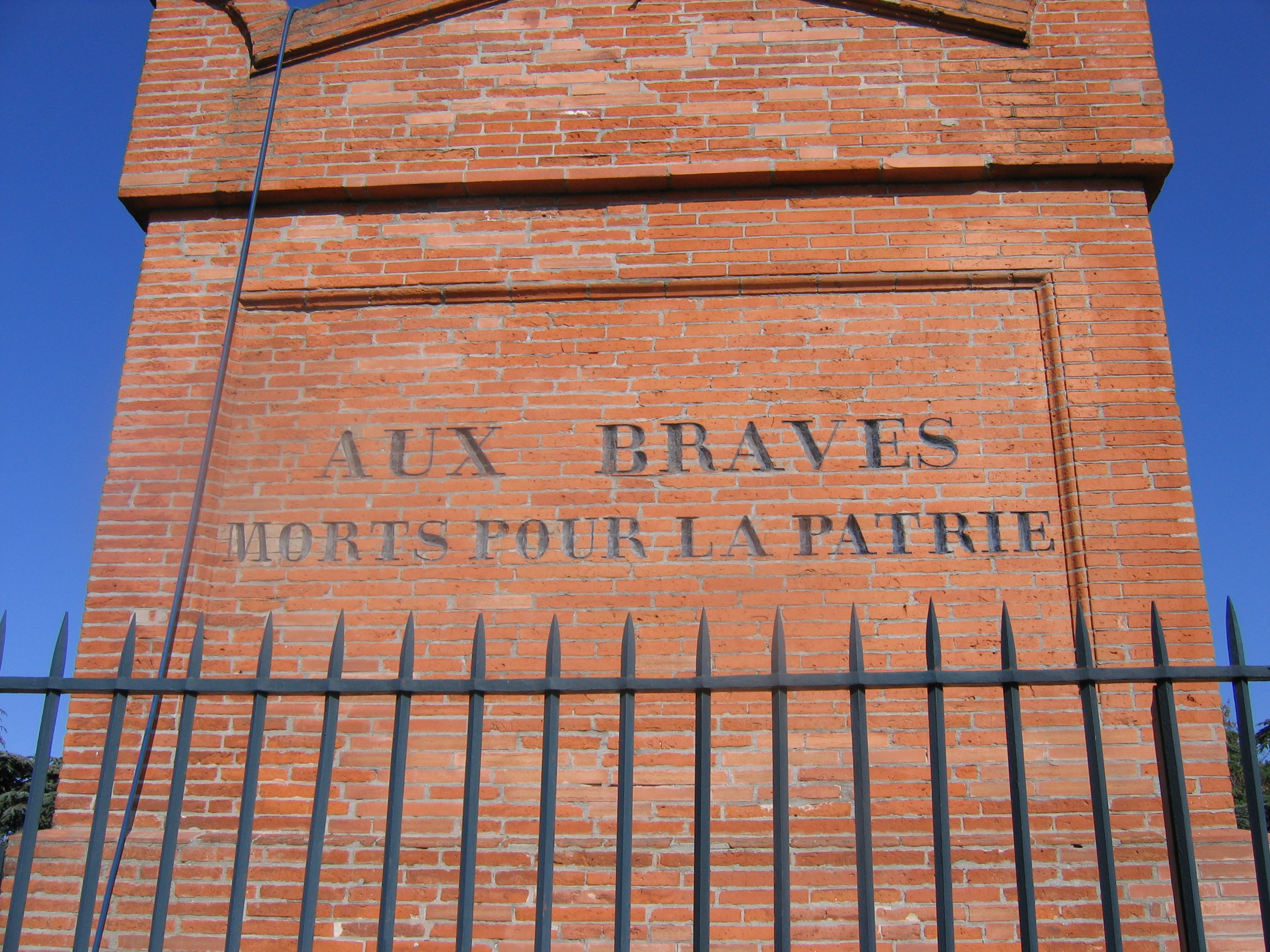
Toulouse monument TO THE BRAVE MEN WHO DIED FOR THE FATHERLAND.

== Notes ==
Preceded by Battle of Paris (1814)	Napoleonic Wars; Battle of Toulouse (1814)	Succeeded by Battle of Bayonne
