= Ponts Jumeaux =

Ponts-Jumeaux
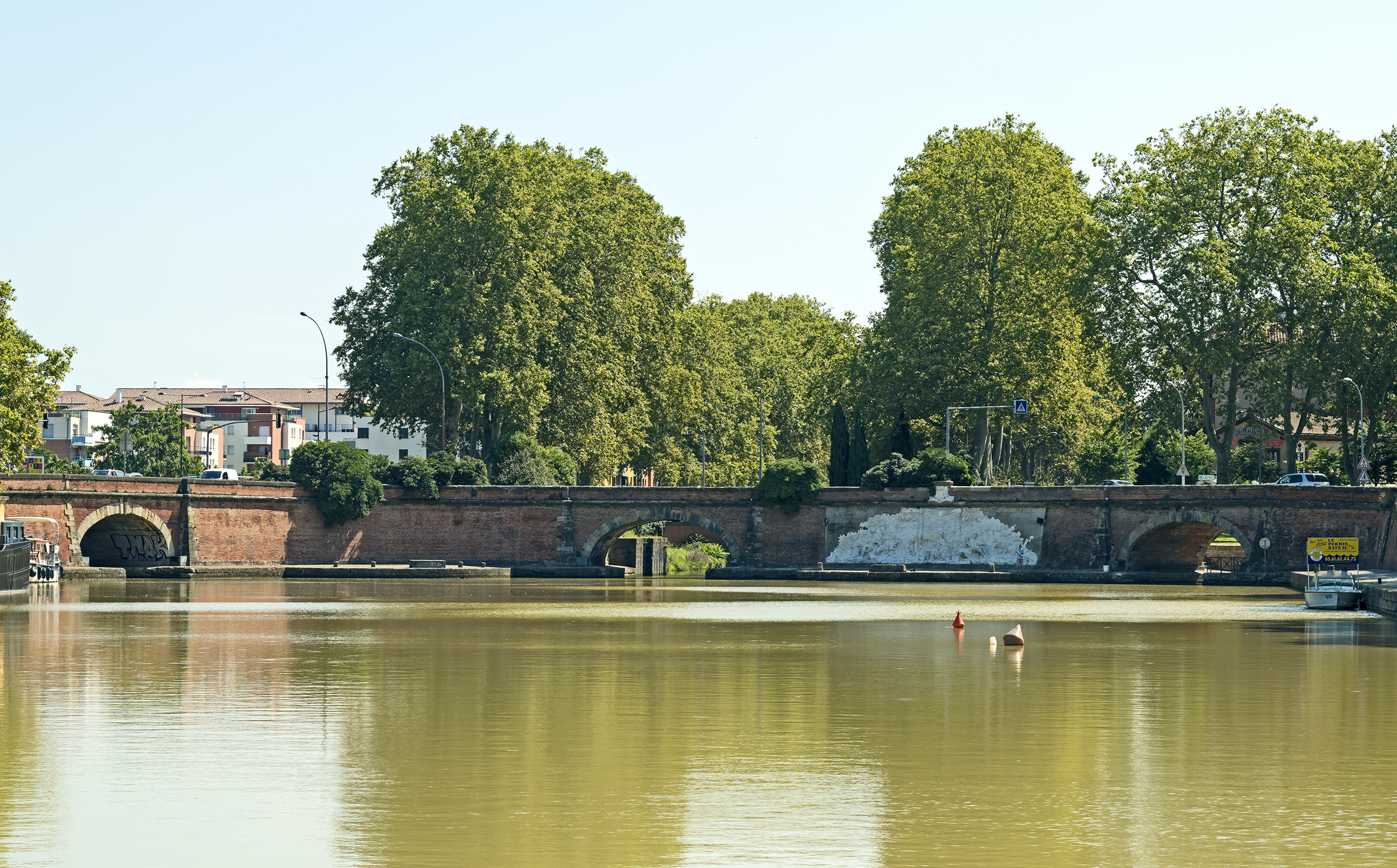
- Twin Bridges
- Coordinates: 43°36′40″N 1°25′10″E
- Carries: Road on the north and south bridges; cycle on the central bridge
- Crosses: From north to south the mouth of the lateral canal to the Canal de Garonne, the Midi Canal and the Canal de Brienne
- Locale: Toulouse, France
- Maintained by: Port de l'Embouchure, property of the State

Characteristics
- Design: Masonry bridge
- Material: Stone, ashlar, brick

History
- Designer: Joseph-Marie de Saget
- Construction start: 1771, 1774, 1844

The Ponts Jumeaux (English: Twin Bridges) is the point at which the Canal du Midi joins the Canal de Garonne and the River Garonne, via the Canal de Brienne. It was built in 1774 by Joseph-Marie de Saget, a civil engineer in the province of Languedoc in Toulouse.

In fact, there are three bridges, each of which is the entrance to a canal. The entrance to the Canal du Midi is in the center. The Canal de Garonne to the north. The Canal de Brienne to the south. The north bridge was added during construction of the Canal de Garonne in 1844.

For boats to turn from one canal into another, the close quarters usually require them to proceed into the basin and turn before going into the next canal. The basin contains the Port de l'Embouchure.

== History ==
The ancient economic dream of connecting the Mediterranean Sea to the Atlantic Ocean by waterway in order to avoid the obligatory passage of goods through the Strait of Gibraltar was realized in the 17th century by the Languedoc States on behalf of which Pierre-Paul Riquet excavated the Midi Canal from Sète to Toulouse. The Midi Canal's waters, via the descent lock of the port de l'Embouchure, which began construction in 1670, joins the Garonne on which traffic continues until Bordeaux.

A first bridge crossed the port at the outlet of the canal, the Petit Gragnague bridge. Because of the obstacle presented by the Bazacle, the canal could not reach the river Garonne until well downstream of the waterway, north of Toulouse, and the boats which sailed on the Garonne upstream, likewise, could not reach the canal. Similarly, the boats that circulated on the canal could not reach the ports of Garaud, the Port de la Daurade, Port Viguerie, or Saint-Pierre in the center of Toulouse.

To get around the obstacle, the archbishop of Toulouse, Étienne-Charles de Loménie de Brienne, as president of the Languedoc States, financed, nearly a hundred years later, the excavation of a canal, which he entrusted to Joseph-Marie de Saget, a civil engineer from the province of Languedoc. Commissioned in 1776, the Canal de Brienne crossed the Bazacle near the port de l'Embouchure, permitting the continuity of the navigation upstream of the waterway.

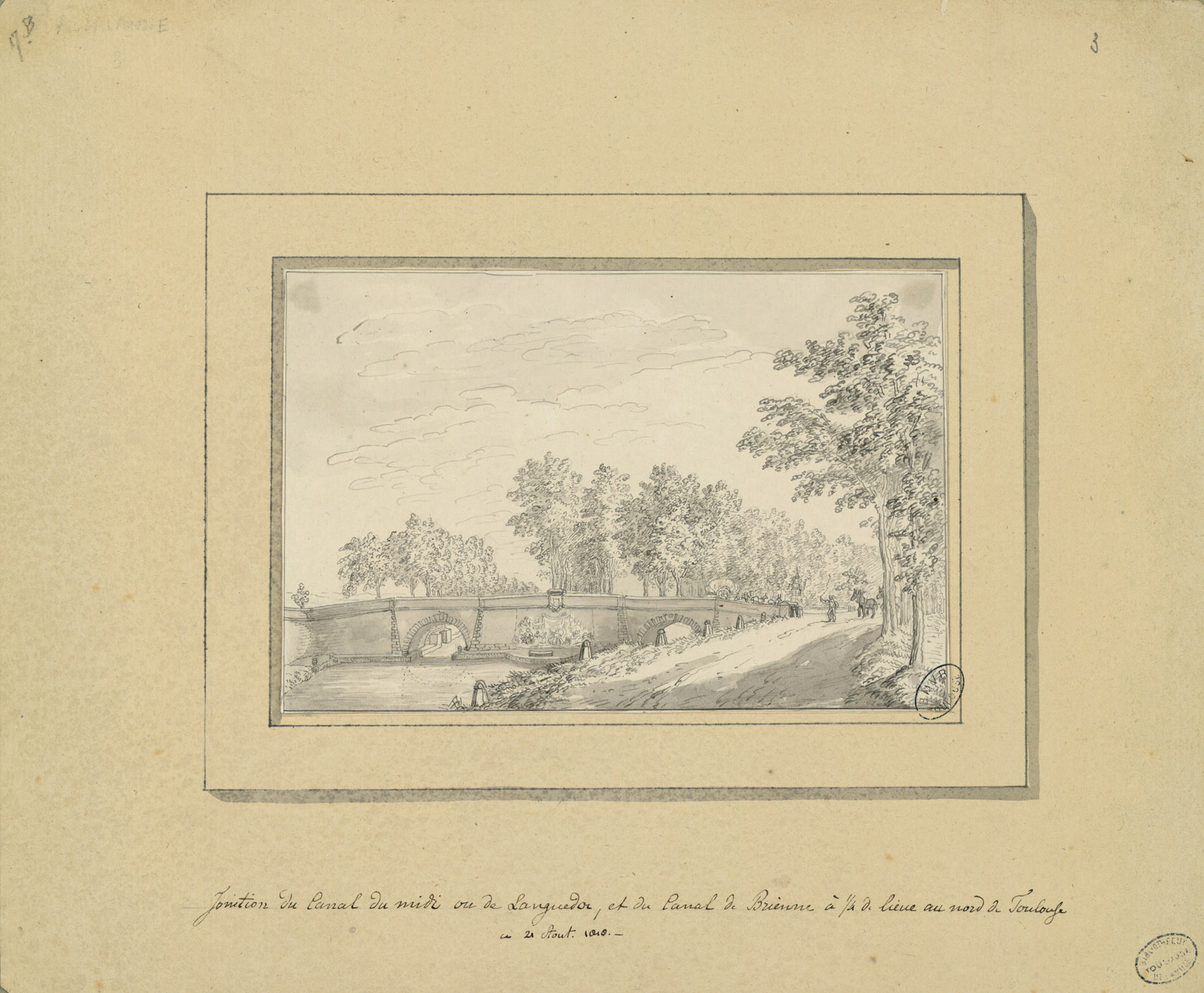
Jonction du Canal du Midi ou de Languedoc, et du Canal de Brienne à 1/4 de lieue au nord de Toulouse le 21 août 1818, (Junction of the Canal du Midi or de Languedoc, and the Canal de Brienne at a 1/4 of a league north of Toulouse on August 21, 1818), ink drawing, Ancely collection of the Library of Toulouse

The port de l'Embouchure was widened at the confluence of the two canals. The construction of the two bridges at the junction of the two mouths was necessary. The span of the Petit Gragnague bridge, which previously crossed only the Canal du Midi, was too short due to the excavation of the Brienne canal, and was demolished and replaced by two identical bridges, the Ponts-Jumeaux. Each span of the Ponts-Jumeaux includes an arch en anse de panier (in basket handle, a type of elliptical three-point curve) with a keystone and bandeau (bandage, in French architecture) in stone as the support of the parapet, the cornice and the external arch of the vaults. Their construction was also entrusted to Joseph-Marie Saget. The first was completed in 1771, the second in 1774. The space between the two was decorated in 1775 with an allegorical bas-relief carved in Carrara marble by François Lucas, professor at the Royal Academy. All were inaugurated in 1776.

The irregular course of the Garonne, with variable flows and violent floods, required the construction of a new canal to reach Bordeaux. The decision was made in 1838, and the construction of the lateral canal to the Garonne was entrusted to the divisional inspector of bridges and causeways, Jean-Baptiste de Baudre. Beginning in 1857, it connected Toulouse to Castets-en-Dorthe and ensured the junction from the port de l'Embouchure with the Canal du Midi, together taking the name of Canal des Deux-Mers. A third bridge was built over the third canal, connecting to the other two and giving the port, once again enlarged on this occasion, the shape of a hemicycle. A work of art and civil engineering, it was enhanced by the bas-relief of the sculptor François Lucas. The ensemble of Ponts-Jumeaux, now three bridges, constitutes a beautiful classic composition and a major work of river heritage.

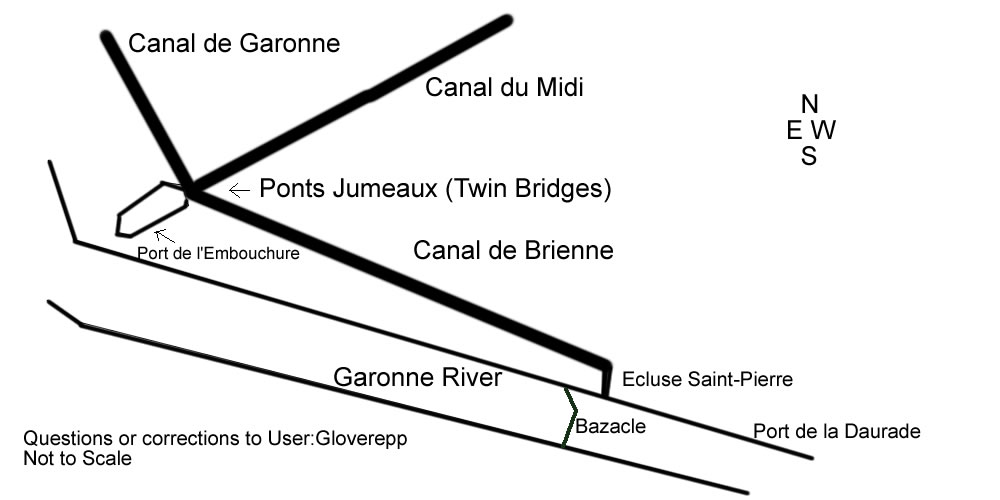
Twin Bridges Drawing showing merging of Canal du Midi, Canal de Brienne, and Canal de Garonne.

On May 7, 1906, the AE line of the Ancien tramway de Toulouse connected the rue Lafayette to the Ponts-Jumeaux.

At the end of the 1970s, the lock and the mouth on the Garonne disappeared with the development of the Toulouse ring road and the construction of the Ponts-Jumeaux interchange. The basin was closed on the river side. The waters of the port that always joined the Garonne by the old lock are now buried at the right of the ring road bridge.

== Bas relief ==
A bas-relief is presented between the bridges south side by the Toulouse artist Francois Lucas in 1775 in Carrara marble.

"The allegorical sculpture depicts Occitania in the center holding the rudder of a boat decorated with the Languedoc cross. She orders two cherub laborers to dig the canal for the 'convenience and security of her commerce'. The Canal is personified by a bearded man, his left arm leaning on an urn. The cherub laborers are placed in front of a lock behind which looms a boat sail. Between the sail and the central wall, we can see a panorama of Toulouse on which one can see the dome of the Carthusians. On the right the Garonne, holding a cornucopia, a cherub laborer holding a plow encourages oxen with his hand. Occitania represents the States of Languedoc, funding the project. The action of the Province allows prosperity and fertility to come to the city of Toulouse, personified by the Garonne."

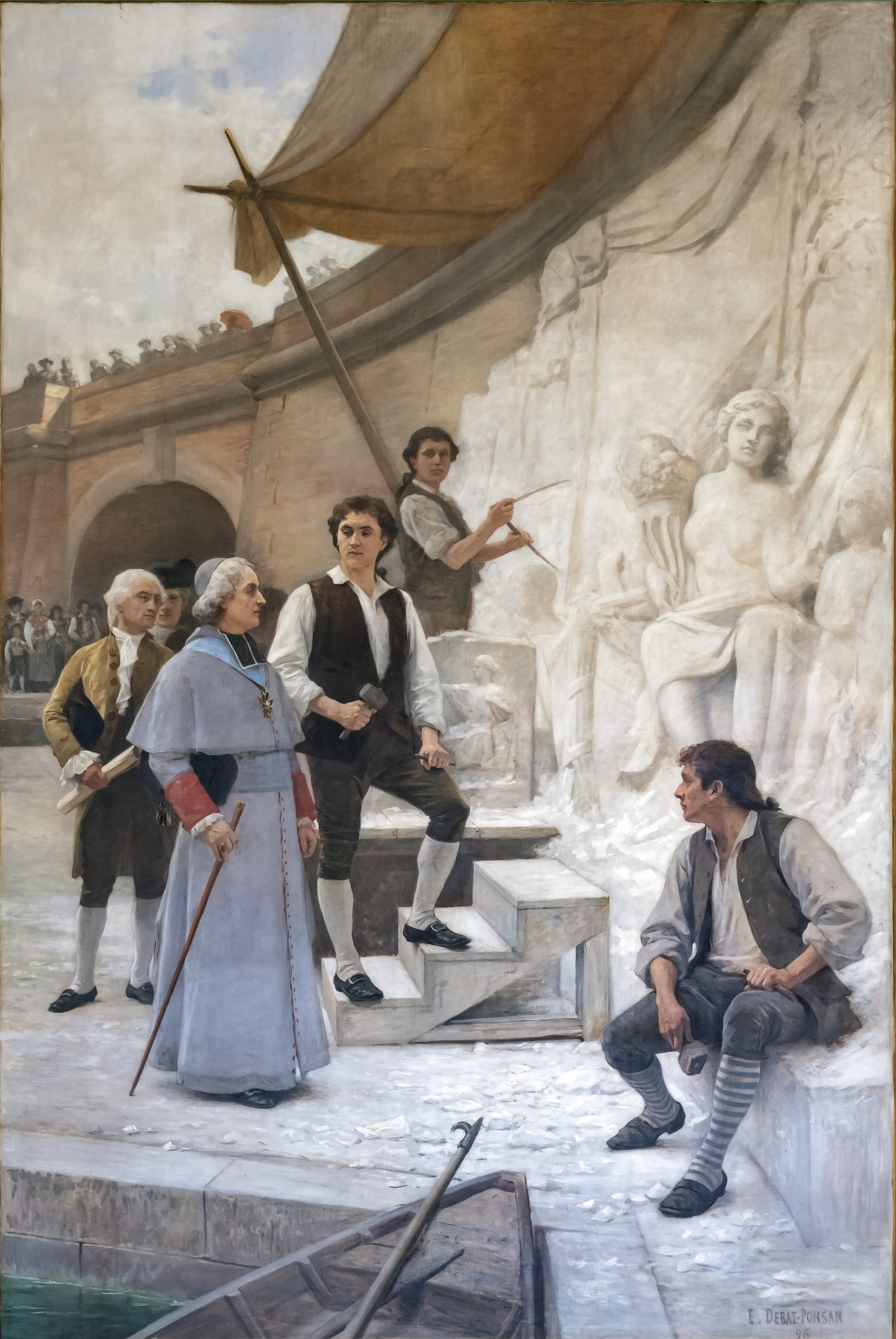
Une visite au sculpteur (1896), Édouard Debat-Ponsan, Capitole de Toulouse

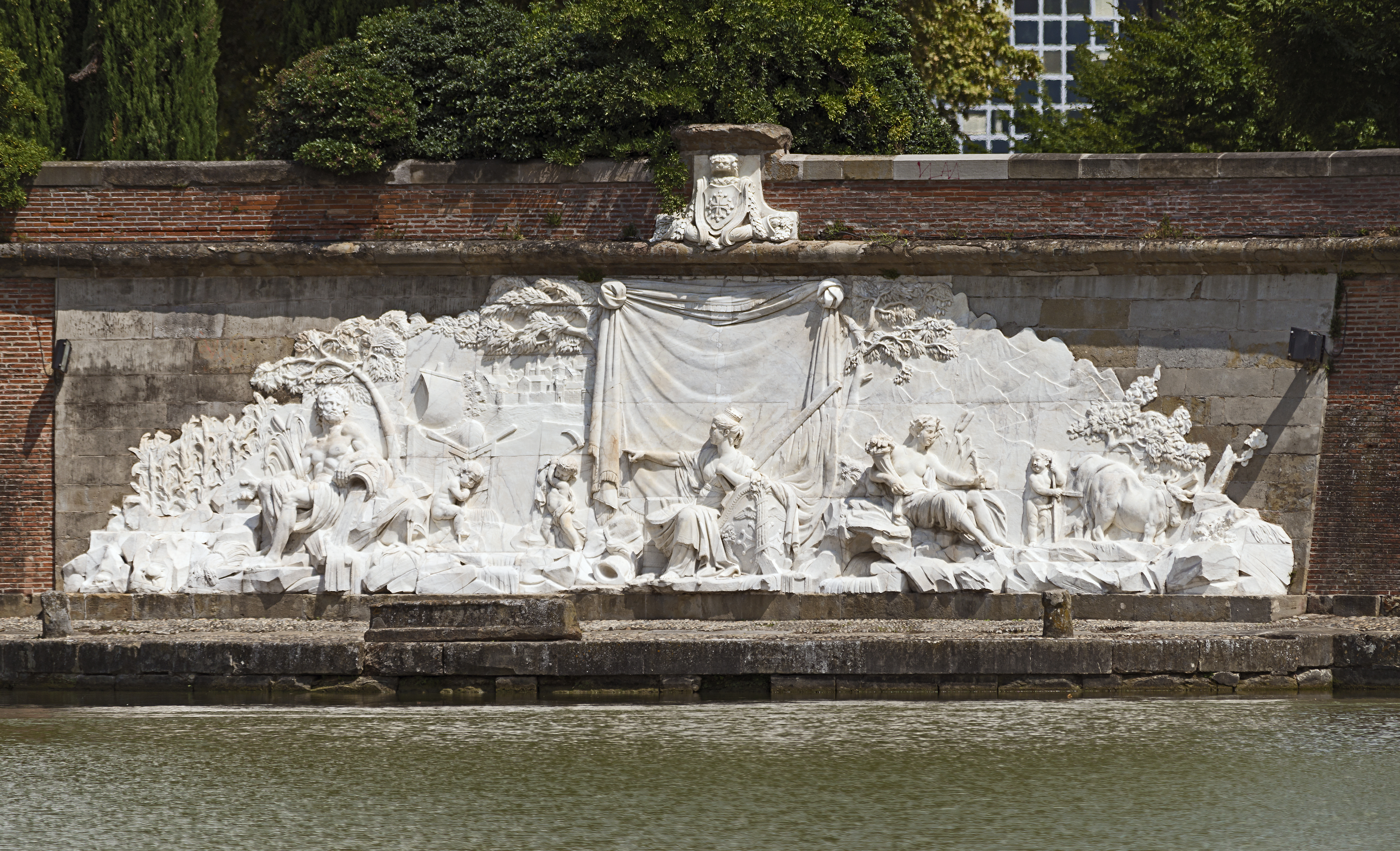
The bas-relief of François Lucas.
