= Battle of Toulouse order of battle =

The Battle of Toulouse saw a French army led by Marshal Nicolas Soult defend the city of Toulouse against the Marquess of Wellington's British, Portuguese, and Spanish army. The fighting took place on 10 April 1814 and Soult evacuated the city late in the evening of 11 April after suffering defeat. Allied casualties in the bitter fighting exceeded French losses by more than a thousand. Official news of the end of the war did not reach Wellington until the afternoon of 12 April.

== Abbreviations used ==
=== Military rank ===
- Gen = General
- Lt Gen = Lieutenant-General
- Maj Gen = Major-General
- GD = général de division
- Brig Gen = Brigadier-General
- GB = général de brigade
- Col = Colonel
- Lt Col = Lieutenant Colonel
- Maj = Major
- Capt = Captain
- Lt = Lieutenant

=== Other ===
- (w) = wounded
- (mw) = mortally wounded
- (k) = killed in action
- (c) = captured

== Anglo-allied army ==
Commander-in-Chief: Field Marshal the Marquess of Wellington

Cavalry Commander: Lt Gen Stapleton Cotton

Quartermaster-General: Maj Gen Sir George Murray

Adjutant-General: Maj Gen the Hon Edward Pakenham

Military Secretary: Capt (brevet Lt Col) Lord FitzRoy Somerset

Commander, Royal Artillery: brevet Lt Col Alexander Dickson

Commander, Royal Engineers: Lt Col Howard Elphinstone

Army total: 48,765 (40,325 infantry, 6,490 cavalry, 1,950 artillery)

=== Wellington's Corps ===
Division	Brigade	Regiments and Others
Light Division Maj Gen Charles Alten (4,275 total)	1st Brigade Maj Gen James Kempt	1/43rd Foot; 1/95th Rifles; 3/95th Rifles; 3rd Portuguese Caçadores
Light Division Maj Gen Charles Alten (4,275 total)	2nd Brigade Lt Col John Colborne	1/52nd Foot; 2/95th Rifles; 1st Portuguese Caçadores; 17th Portuguese Line (2 bns)
3rd Division Lt Gen Thomas Picton (4,566 total)	1st Brigade Maj Gen Thomas Brisbane	1/45th Foot; 1/74th Foot; 1/88th Foot; 5/60th Rifles
3rd Division Lt Gen Thomas Picton (4,566 total)	2nd Brigade Col John Keane	1/5th Foot; 2/83rd Foot; 2/87th Foot; 94th Foot
3rd Division Lt Gen Thomas Picton (4,566 total)	3rd Brigade Maj Gen Manley Power	9th Portuguese Line (2 bns); 21st Portuguese Line (2 bns); 11th Portuguese Caçadores
Cavalry Division Maj Gen Henry Fane (1,707 total)	Heavy Cavalry Brigade Col Clifton (891 total)	1st Life Guards; 2nd Life Guards; Royal Horse Guards
Cavalry Division Maj Gen Henry Fane (1,707 total)	Light Cavalry Brigade Col Doherty (vice Fane) (816 total)	13th Light Dragoons; 14th Light Dragoons
Unattached Cavalry Brigades (2,127 total)	Heavy Cavalry Brigade Lord Charles Manners (1,426 total)	5th Dragoon Guards; 3rd Dragoons; 4th Dragoons
Unattached Cavalry Brigades (2,127 total)	Heavy Cavalry Brigade Brig Gen Bülow (701 total)	1st KGL Dragoons; 2nd KGL Dragoons
Artillery (1,950 total)		Turner's Battery, Royal Artillery (RA); Gardiner's Troop, Royal Horse Artillery (RHA)
Corps total: 14,625 (8,841 infantry, 3,834 cavalry, 1,950 artillery)

=== Freire's Corps (part of Spanish 4th Army) ===
Gen Manuel Freire

Division	Regiments and Others
Spanish Provisional Division (Brigades from 3rd and 5th Divisions) Gen Antonio Garcés de Marcilla y Cerdán (3,959 total)	Voluntarios de la Corona; Voluntarios de Ribero (Ribeiro); Oviedo; 1º Cántabro; Laredo; Tiradores de Cantabria
Spanish 4th Division Gen José María de Ezpeleta y Enrile (3,576 total)	2º de Asturias; 2º de Guadalajara; 6º Regimiento de Marina; Voluntarios de Asturias; Regimento de Santiago
Cavalry	Húsares de Cantabria (120)
Artillery	Preto's Portuguese Battery; Arriaga's Portuguese Battery
Corps total: 7,535 infantry

=== Hill's Corps ===
Lt Gen Sir Rowland Hill

Division	Brigade	Regiments and Others
2nd Division Lt Gen the Hon Sir William Stewart (6,940 total)	1st Brigade Maj Gen John Byng	1/3rd Foot; 1/57th Foot; 1st Provisional Bn (2/31st and 2/66th Foot)
2nd Division Lt Gen the Hon Sir William Stewart (6,940 total)	2nd Brigade Maj Gen Edward Barnes	1/50th Foot; 1/71st Foot; 1/92nd Foot
2nd Division Lt Gen the Hon Sir William Stewart (6,940 total)	3rd Brigade Col the Hon Richard O'Callaghan	1/28th Foot; 2/34th Foot; 1/39th Foot
2nd Division Lt Gen the Hon Sir William Stewart (6,940 total)	Portuguese Brigade Lt Col Henry Hardinge	6th Portuguese Line (2 bns); 18th Portuguese Line (2 bns); 6th Portuguese Caçadores
Portuguese Division Maj Gen Carlos Le Cor (3,952 total)	1st Brigade Brig Gen Almeida	2nd Portuguese Line (2 bns); 14th Portuguese Line (2 bns)
Portuguese Division Maj Gen Carlos Le Cor (3,952 total)	2nd Brigade Maj Gen John Buchan	4th Portuguese Line (2 bns); 10th Portuguese Line (2 bns); 10th Portuguese Caçadores
Spanish 1st Division Gen Pablo Morillo (2,001 total)		León; Victoria; Doyle
Artillery		Maxwell's Battery, RA; Beane's Troop, RHA; Da Silva's Portuguese Battery; Michael's Portuguese Battery
Corps total: 12,893 infantry

=== Beresford's Corps ===
Marshal William Beresford

Division	Brigade	Regiments and Others
4th Division Lt Gen Galbraith Lowry Cole (5,363 total)	1st Brigade Maj Gen William Anson	3/27th Foot; 1/40th Foot; 1/48th Foot
4th Division Lt Gen Galbraith Lowry Cole (5,363 total)	2nd Brigade Maj Gen Robert Ross	1/7th Foot; 1/20th Foot; 1/23rd Foot
4th Division Lt Gen Galbraith Lowry Cole (5,363 total)	Portuguese Brigade Brig Gen José Vasconcellos	11th Portuguese Line; 23rd Portuguese Line; 7th Portuguese Caçadores
6th Division Lt Gen Sir Henry Clinton (5,693 total)	1st Brigade Maj Gen Denis Pack	1/42nd Foot; 1/79th Foot; 1/91st Foot
6th Division Lt Gen Sir Henry Clinton (5,693 total)	2nd Brigade Maj Gen John Lambert	1/11th Foot; 1/36th Foot; 1/61st Foot
6th Division Lt Gen Sir Henry Clinton (5,693 total)	Portuguese Brigade Col James Douglas	8th Portuguese Line; 12th Portuguese Line; 9th Portuguese Caçadores
Cavalry (2,656 total)	1st Hussar Brigade Maj Gen Edward Somerset (1,717 total)	7th Hussars; 10th Hussars; 15th Hussars
Cavalry (2,656 total)	2nd Hussar Brigade Col Friedrich Arentschildt (vice Hussey Vivian)	1st Hussars KGL; 18th Hussars
Artillery		Daniel's Battery, RA; Brandreth's Battery, RA
Corps total: 13,712 (11,056 infantry, 2,656 cavalry)

== French Army of Spain ==
Commander-in-Chief: Marshal Soult

Army total: 38,843 (31,793 infantry, 2,700 cavalry, 4,350 artillery)

Division	Brigade	Regiments and Others
1st Division GD Augustin Darricau (3,490 total)	1st Brigade GB Joseph-François Fririon	6th Légère (1 bn); 76th Ligne (1 bn); 69th Ligne (2 bns)
1st Division GD Augustin Darricau (3,490 total)	2nd Brigade GB Pierre André Hercule Berlier	36th Ligne (2 bns); 39th Ligne (1 bn); 65th Ligne (2 bns)
2nd Division GD Jean Barthélemy Darmagnac (4,456 total)	1st Brigade GB Louis Jean-Baptiste Leseur	31st Légère (2 bns); 51st Ligne (1 bn); 75th Ligne (2 bns)
2nd Division GD Jean Barthélemy Darmagnac (4,456 total)	2nd Brigade GB Jean-Baptiste Pierre Menne	118th Ligne (3 bns); 120th Ligne (3 bns)
4th Division GD Eloi Charlemagne Taupin (k) (4,864 total)	1st Brigade GB Jean-Pierre-Antoine Rey	12th Légère (2 bns); 32nd Ligne (2 bns); 43rd Ligne (2 bns)
4th Division GD Eloi Charlemagne Taupin (k) (4,864 total)	2nd Brigade GB Joseph Gasquet	47th Ligne (2 bns); 55th Ligne (1 bn); 58th Ligne (1 bn)
5th Division GD Jean-Pierre Maransin (3,196 total)	1st Brigade GB Marie Étienne de Barbot	4th Légère (1 bn); 40th Ligne (2 bns); 50th Ligne (1 bn)
5th Division GD Jean-Pierre Maransin (3,196 total)	2nd Brigade GB Claude Pierre Rouget	27th Ligne (1 bn); 34th Ligne (1 bn); 59th Ligne (1 bn)
6th Division GD Eugene-Casimir Villatte (4,270 total)	1st Brigade GB Louis Paul Baille de Saint-Pol	21st Légère (1 bn); 86th Ligne (1 bn); 96th Ligne (1 bn); 100th Ligne (1 bn)
6th Division GD Eugene-Casimir Villatte (4,270 total)	2nd Brigade GB Étienne François Lamorendière	28th Légère (1 bn); 103rd Ligne (1 bn); 119th Ligne (2 bns)
8th Division GD Jean Isidore Harispe (4,250 total)	1st Brigade GB Guillaume Dauture	9th Légère (2 bns); 25th Légère (2 bns); 34th Légère (2 bns)
8th Division GD Jean Isidore Harispe (4,250 total)	2nd Brigade GB Jean-Baptiste Charles Baurot	10th Légère (2 bns); 45th Ligne (1 bn); 81st Ligne (1 bn); 115th Ligne (1 bn); 116th Ligne (1 bn); 117th Ligne (1 bn)
Reserve Division GD Jean-Pierre Travot (7,267 total)	1st Brigade GB Bernard Pourailly	4 bns conscripts
Reserve Division GD Jean-Pierre Travot (7,267 total)	2nd Brigade GB Armand Wouillemont de Vivier	4 bns conscripts
Cavalry Division GD Pierre Benoît Soult (2,700 total)	1st Brigade GB Jean-Baptiste Berton	2nd Hussars; 13th Chasseurs à Cheval; 21st Chasseurs à Cheval
Cavalry Division GD Pierre Benoît Soult (2,700 total)	2nd Brigade GB Charles Guillaume Vial d'Alais	5th Chasseurs à Cheval; 10th Chasseurs à Cheval; 15th Chasseurs à Cheval; 22nd Chasseurs à Cheval
Auxiliaries (4,350 total)		Artillery, Engineers, Other
Army total: 38,843 (31,793 infantry, 2,700 cavalry, 4,350 artillery)

== Books ==
- Chandler, David. Dictionary of the Napoleonic Wars. New York: Macmillan, 1979. ISBN 0-02-523670-9
- Glover, Michael. The Peninsular War 1807-1814. London: Penguin, 2001. ISBN 0-14-139041-7
- Smith, Digby. The Napoleonic Wars Data Book. London: Greenhill, 1998. ISBN 1-85367-276-9
- Oman, Charles. Wellington's Army, 1809-1814. London: Greenhill, (1913) 1993. ISBN 0-947898-41-7
- Lipscombe, Nick (2010). The Peninsular War Atlas. Oxford: Osprey. ISBN 978-1-84908-364-5.
