= Port de l'Embouchure =

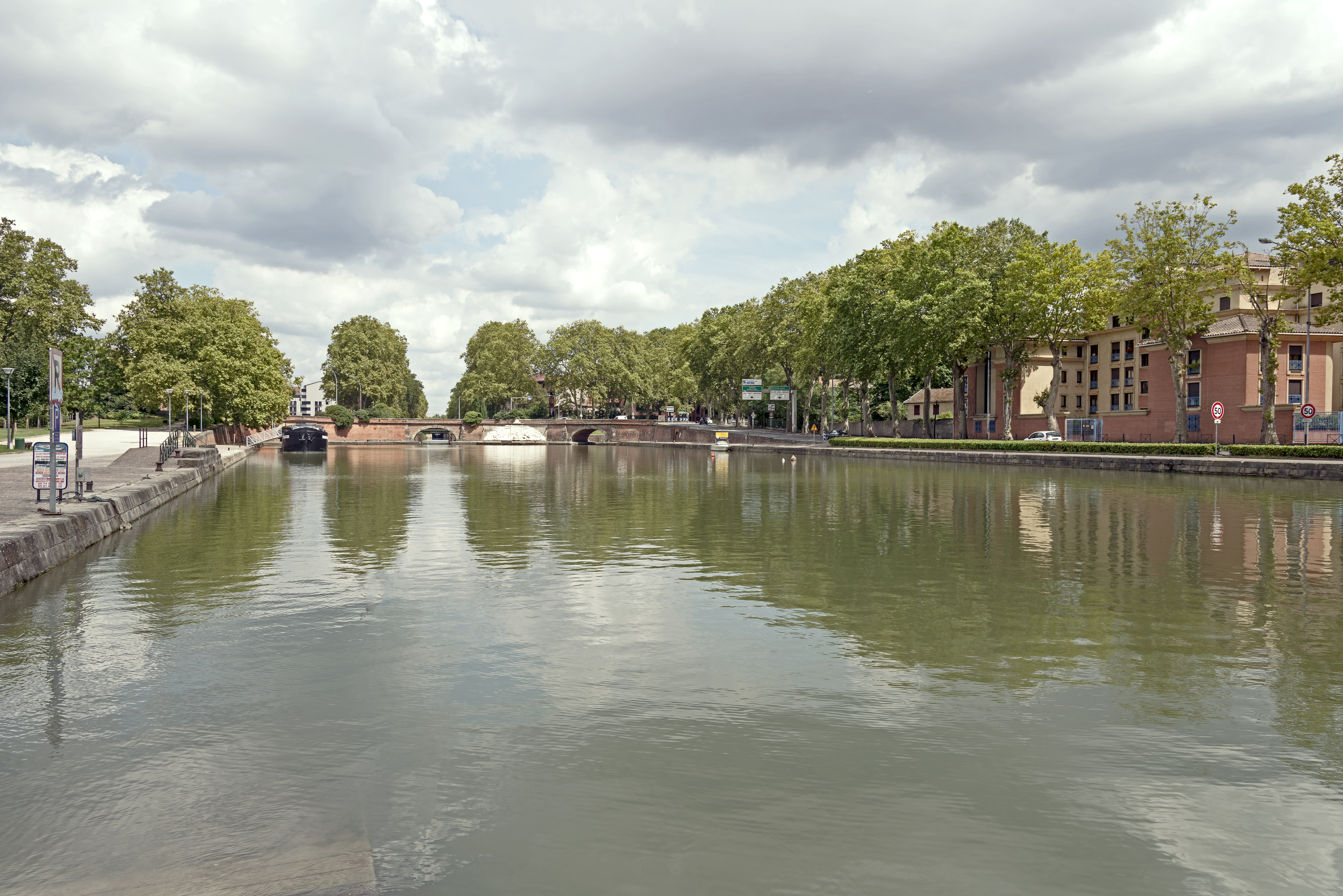
Port de l'embouchure

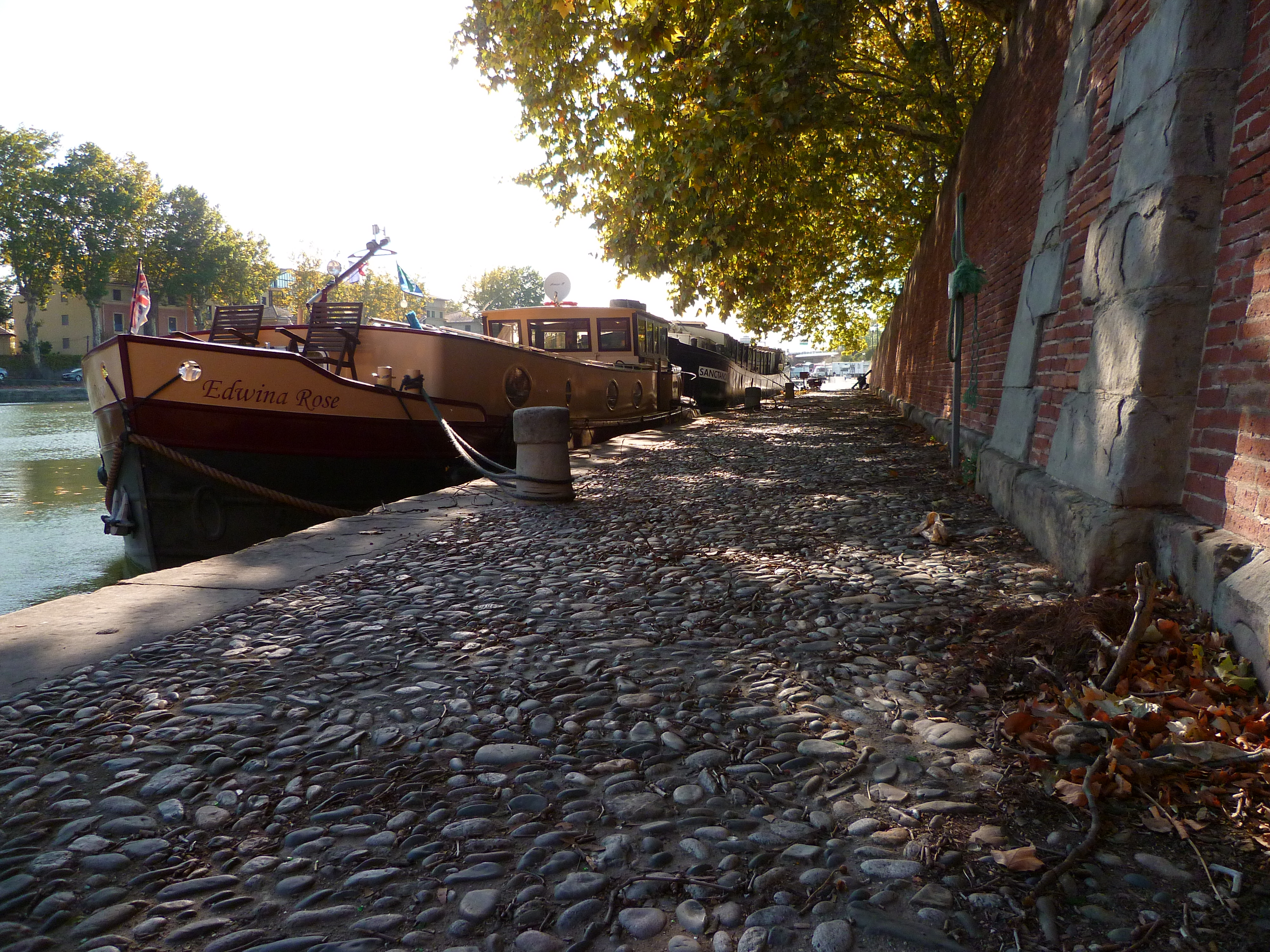

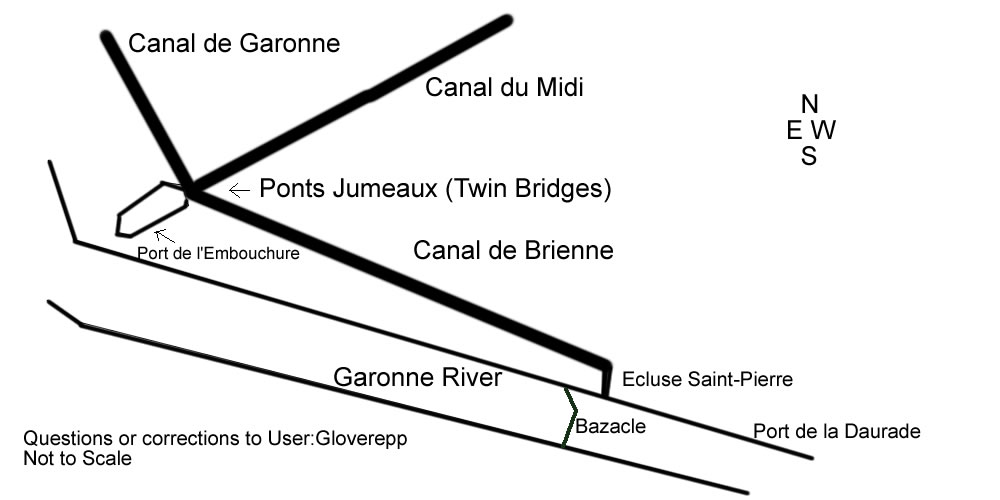
Twin Bridges Drawing showing merging of Canal du Midi, Canal de Brienne, and Canal de Garonne. 43°36′40″N 1°25′10″E

The Port de l'Embouchure (Occitan: Pòrt de l'embocadura; English: Port of Mouth) is one of the two ports located in Toulouse on the Canal du Midi. The other being the Port Saint-Sauveur. This port is located in the basin at the Ponts Jumeaux (English: Twin Bridges). From the basin are found the entrances to the canals Canal de Garonne, Canal du Midi and Canal de Brienne.
