= Port de la Daurade =

Port in Toulouse, France

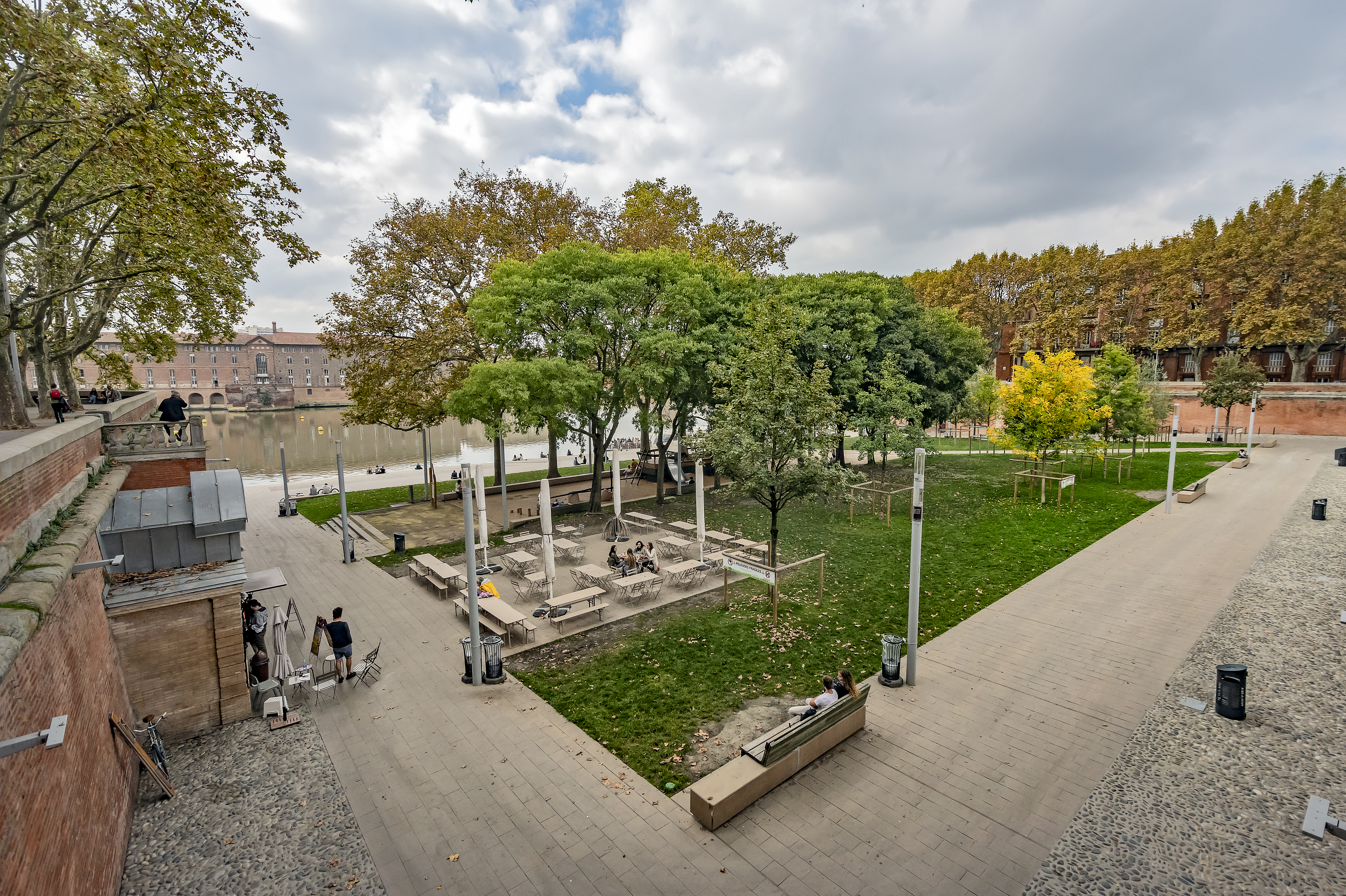
Porte de la Daurade SW exposure 43°36′04.03″N 1°26′18.79″E

The Port de la Daurade (Occitan: Pòrt de la Daurada; English: Sea Bream) is found on the right bank of the Garonne River in Toulouse. Boats leave from here for travel on the Garonne and the Canal du Midi. The Canal de Brienne is near as is the bazacle.
