= Bazacle Milling Company =

Watermill system in Toulouse, France

Coordinates: 43°36′15″N 1°25′55″E

Société des moulins de Bazacle
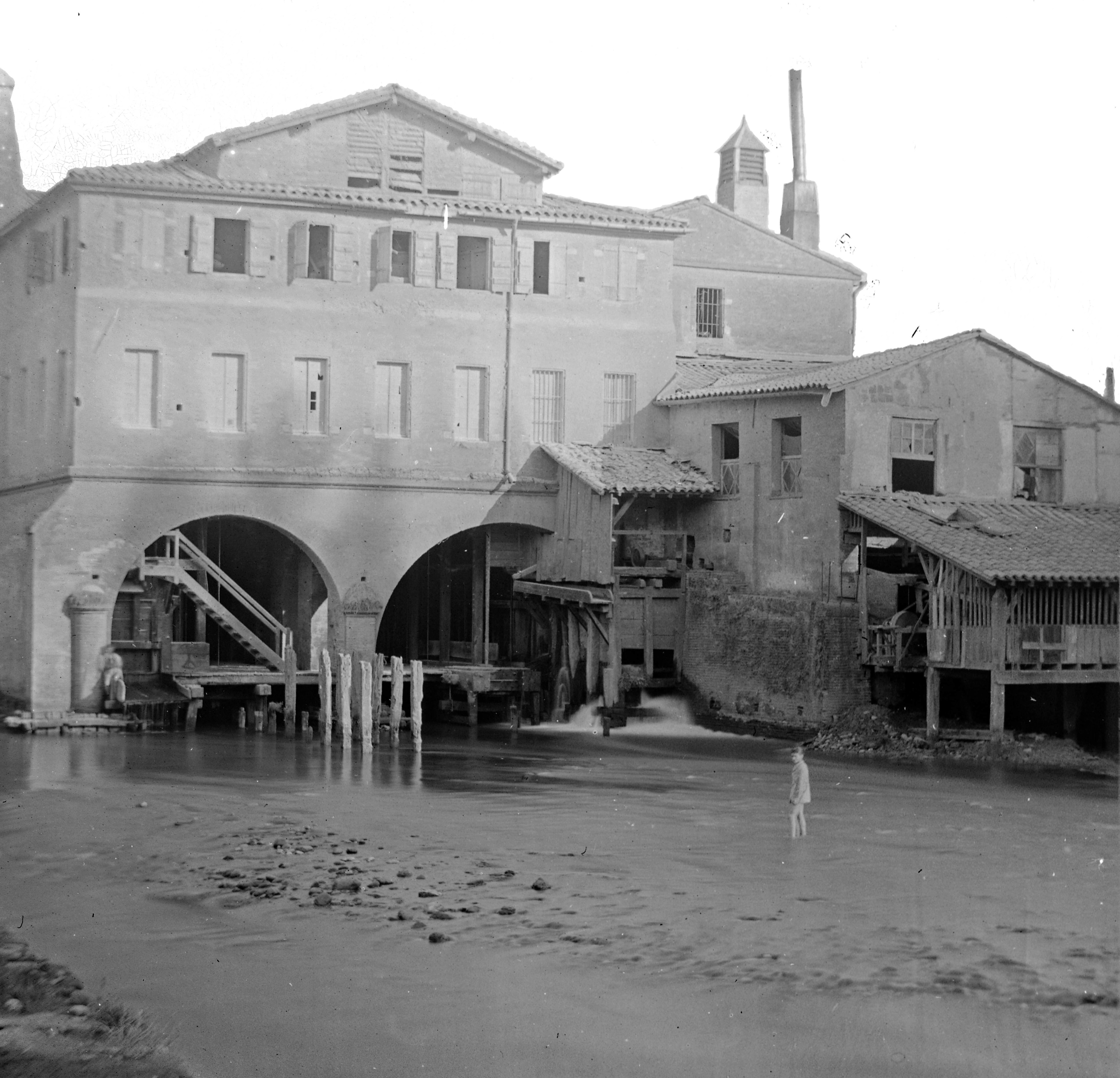
- Type: Joint-stock company
- Industry: Milling
- Fate: Subsidiary
- Parent: Électricité de France

The Society of Moulins du Bazacle, also known as Bazacle Company, is a French watermill system founded in Toulouse in the 12th century by the citizens of the city to share the operation of a series of mills installed on the site of the Bazacle. The mills were used to process wheat harvested from the Toulouse Plain into flour.

It was the first recorded European joint-stock company.

== History ==
=== Early history ===
The first mills of Bazacle that captured the vast force of the Garonne were erected along the river by 1070. By the 11th century, there were sixty. They were then referred to as moulins à nef or floating mills, built on boats or simple floating pontoons, that were replaced in 1190 by land mills. These "giants" of wood were the pride of Toulouse and a source of the city's great wealth. "In the 18th century, the Bazacle mills were an example of technical modernity famous throughout Europe and appeared in the Encyclopedia of Diderot and d'Alembert," according to Corinne Clément and Sonia Ruiz, in "Toulouse secret and unusual."

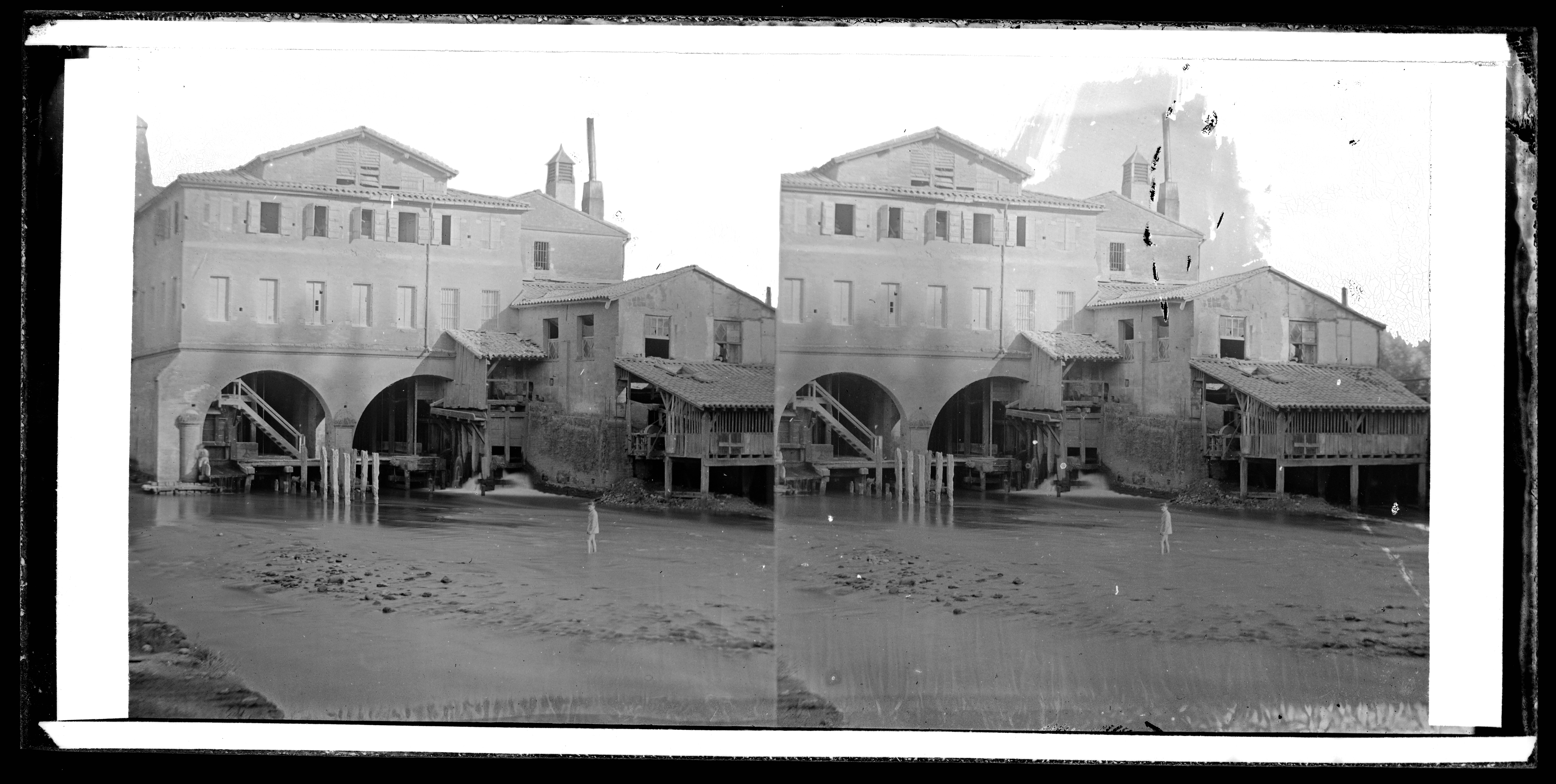
Moulins du Bazacle. Eugène Trutat

The mills of Bazacle were recognized by the capitouls, or chief magistrates of Toulouse from 1152. A written act granted in 1177 by the owner of the site, the Priory of la Daurade, signaled the exploitation of these mills near Toulouse, which was by then a city of 50,000 inhabitants and the capital of a cereal producing region. Set on wooden pavements, resting on hard marl benches, crossing obliquely the course of the river, some sixty high oak and iron mills, which supplied energy to the local millers, were divided between three fords of the Garonne: the Daurade, the Château Narbonnais, and the Bazacle. Very narrow and with a length of nearly half a kilometer, these "carriageways" made it easier to anchor the mills on several large reinforced piles, in order to better benefit from the hydraulic energy provided by a fall in the Garonne of a height of 4 meters.

The main one, the Bazacle dam, mentioned in 1177, was 400 meters long. It consisted of trunks of oak trees sunk into the bottom of the river. In 1183, shortly before the Albigensian Crusade, the Count of Toulouse officially authorized the construction of this causeway, which linked the two banks of the river at a width of a hundred meters. The first floating mills were built nearby to better exploit the current. To force the waters of the river in the wake of the mills, industrialists of the time set up levees which required regular maintenance work due to damage from high water and flooding. Because the construction and repairs required significant sums of money, their owners were forced to unite.

=== Conflict with Daurade Mills ===
Because they were downstream from the Moulins de la Daurade, those of the Bazacle could considerably hinder them by the height of their causeway. After attempting unsuccessfully, between 1278 and 1329, to raise theirs to the detriment of the Moulins of the Château, the owners of the Daurade wanted to guard against the companies of those of the Bazacle. In 1316, they obtained an arbitration which fixed the maximum height of the roadway of the Bazacle.

After the great flood of 1346 which destroyed the Moulins du Château and probably damaged those of the Daurade, the pariers of the Bazacle took advantage of the damage caused on their cause by Charles le Mauvais, to obtain in 1356 authorization from the Parliament of Paris to rebuild much higher than before. This resulted in immediate complaints by the shareholders of Daurade, whose mills could no longer function. They won their case in 1358 but could not enforce the judgement because of a call that dragged on until 1366, when the Parliament of Paris ordered that the pariers of the Bazacle lower their pavement and pay 1,000 livres tournois to the owners of the Daurade. The sum was paid in 1367 but the Mills of the Daurade were ruined for years. The floor, it does not move ... The last pariers or shareholders of Daurade still tried to force those of the Bazacle to comply with court decisions in 1380, in alliance with the pariers of Château, unhappy with the new floor built at the Bazacle after the flood of 1377–78. They obtained a new condemnation of the Bazacle, which was not executed any more than the previous one because of long calls and exhaustion of the complainants. Dropped by the pariers of the Château, the pariers of Daurade obtained permission in 1384 to withdraw, which they did one after the other until the extinction of the complaint in 1408.

== Operation ==
In order to raise the capital needed for the construction of these dams, the millers formed a company to which they entrusted their savings, in return for which they received notarized papers attesting to their investments. These notarial papers were called uchaux. They were anonymous, as are the stocks of current limited companies, so they could pass from hand to hand quickly, and ownership of three companies operating the dams was eventually transferred from the millers to the Toulouse bourgeoisie, who were eager for good investments.

The company consisted of 96 uchaux or shares, which the owners had the right to resell without consent or right of preemption of the other partners. These shares were exchanged at a price which varied according to the economic situation, i.e., the good or poor operating results of the mills. From 1372 onwards, the Société des Moulins de Bazacle owned the mills and not only the causeways connecting them. It no longer served only to share equally the work of maintenance of the causeways but also to distribute the benefits of the operation of the mills. Each owner of shares or "uchaux" had an interest in one-sixteenth on each sack of wheat deposited by the peasants who came to grind their wheat.

The mills were unparalleled in prosperity and their owners, these "gentlemen of the Bazacle", made a fortune. For the first time, capitalist companies were being spoken of, because their owners, the pariers, received their revenues according to their shares. In the Middle Ages, the old mill became the first known per-action company and this hard monopoly existed until 19th century. On the eve of the French Revolution, the commune of Toulouse authorized the installation of nine amidonniers - hence the name given to the district - five tanneries and two paper mills...

"In the 18th century, the mills of Bazacle were a famous example of technical modernity throughout Europe and appeared in the Encyclopedia of Diderot and d'Alembert".

The dividend, paid in kind, was equivalent to 120,000 pounds of flour per year in 1771. It was not paid in cash until 1840, with the appearance of the Société Anonyme du Moulin du Bazacle.

== Modern history ==
In 1840, the Société Anonyme du Moulin du Bazacle appeared. In 1886, it converted into of one of the first hydroelectric plants in France and took the name of the Toulouse Electricity Company.

In 1876, the company of the mills of the Bazacle issued for the first time new shares to the number of 135, with the same rights as the old ones. In 1887, the site and equipment of the Bazacle were leased to "The Toulouse Electricity Company (STE)". The motive power of the mills was distributed to several factories along the Canalet, using an underground network. The first factory to use this energy was the Boyer-Fonfrède cotton factory, founded by a Bordeaux entrepreneur in 1790. Another famous factory was the Garrigou scythe, which was in operation until 1865. At that time, the activity of the 500 workers of the factory was intense. It was said that one could hear "the noise of the hammers, which throughout the year, day and night, resounded in the quarters of the Bazacle."

In 1888, the Toulouse Power Corporation transformed the Bazacle mill into a hydroelectric plant. The Toulouse Electricity Company absorbed the Société Anonyme du Moulin du Bazacle; the merger was effective in 1910. The new entity was called the Toulousaine Electricity Company of the Bazacle (STE). It eventually came under the control of the Reille group, via its backing of the Pyrenean Electric Power Company.

The company was finally nationalized in 1946. The installation belongs to EDF and still functions.

In the 20th century, the factories located along the banks closed one after the other. The tobacco factory, whose production exceeded 2,300 tons per year in the 1950s, was the largest plant in the sector. In 1910, it employed nearly 2,000 workers, mostly women. The last Ninas brand cigarillos were produced in 1979 and the definitive closure of the factory was announced in 1987. Its disappearance marked the end of the industrial exploitation of the Garonne in Toulouse.

In the memory of Toulouse, the Bazacle is a symbol of the economic miracle which benefited the city until the end of the 19th century. A place of toil and wealth production for almost ten centuries, the monument has re-emerged in recent years from the ashes of its glorious industrial past, transformed into a space devoted to discovery and culture.

The characteristics and power of the current hydroelectric plant, reflecting the exploitable power of the site, are a flow of 90 m3/s equipment, a drop height of 4 to 4.7 meters and an installed capacity of 3000 kilowatts.
