= Eloi Charlemagne Taupin =

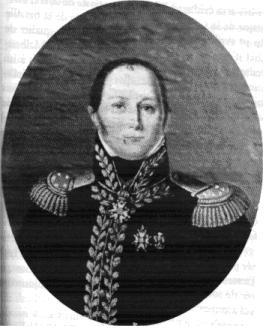
- Eloi Charlemagne Taupin
- Born: 17 August 1767; Barbery, Oise, France
- Died: 10 April 1814 (aged 46) Toulouse, France
- Allegiance: France
- Branch: Infantry
- Service years: 1787–1814
- Rank: General of Division
- Conflicts: War of the First Coalition; Flanders Campaign; War of the Second Coalition; Battle of Montebello; Battle of Marengo; War of the Third Coalition; Battle of Dürenstein; Battle of Austerlitz; War of the Fourth Coalition; Battle of Jena; Battle of Pułtusk; Battle of Ostrołęka; Peninsular War; Second Siege of Zaragoza; War of the Fifth Coalition; Battle of Gefrees; Peninsular War; Battle of Bussaco; Battle of Salamanca; Battle of the Pyrenees; Battle of San Marcial; Battle of the Bidassoa; Battle of Nivelle; Battle of the Nive; Battle of Orthez; Battle of Toulouse †
- Awards: Légion d'Honneur, CC 1805
- Other work: Baron of the Empire, 1809
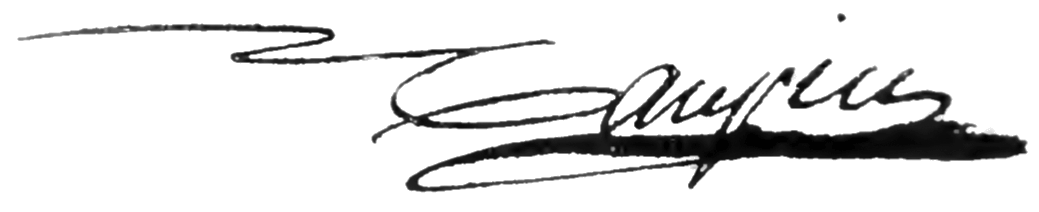
- Signature

Eloi Charlemagne Taupin (French pronunciation: [elwa ʃaʁləmaɲ topɛ̃]; 17 August 1767 – 10 April 1814) became a French soldier before the French Revolution and was killed in 1814 leading his division in battle against the British and the Spanish in southern France. After fighting in the French Revolutionary Wars, he was promoted to command an infantry regiment at the beginning of the First French Empire. He led the unit during the War of the Third Coalition in 1805. The following year he fought in the War of the Fourth Coalition. The year 1808 found him at Zaragoza in Spain where he was wounded. In 1809 he led a brigade during the War of the Fifth Coalition at Gefrees.

Taupin transferred again to Spain where he fought in the Peninsular War including the battles of Bussaco and Salamanca. He was appointed to command an infantry division in October 1812 and in January 1813 was promoted general of division. In 1813 he led his division in the battles of the Pyrenees, San Marcial, the Bidassoa, Nivelle and the Nive. In 1814 he conducted a particularly stubborn defense at Orthez and was fatally wounded leading an attack at Toulouse. Ironically, his death came a few days after Napoleon abdicated his throne. His surname is one of the names inscribed under the Arc de Triomphe, on Column 37.

== Revolution ==
Taupin was born in Barbery, Oise on 17 August 1767. According to a list of transactions that were recorded by the Count of Clermont, Taupin was a warden of the Forest of Pomeraie. He enlisted in the Infantry Regiment de Roi (King's Regiment) on 14 May 1787. He participated in the Estates-General of 1789 as a deputy from Barbery. On 16 February 1791 the Regiment de Roi was disbanded. On 18 September 1791, he joined the 1st battalion of National Volunteers of the Oise as a sous lieutenant and was named captain on 31 January 1792. From 1792 to 1795, he soldiered with the Army of the North and earned promotion to chef de bataillon (major) on 24 May 1794. The 1st Battalion of Oise Volunteers became first the 183rd Demi-Brigade which in 1796 became the 28th Line Infantry Demi-Brigade. From 1796 to 1798, Taupin served in the Army of the Interior and the Army of England. Beginning in 1799, he was assigned to the Army of the Danube.

Taupin fought at the Battle of Montebello on 9 June 1800. He stopped the advance of the Austrian right wing, capturing a body of enemy soldiers and several cannons. He was wounded at the Battle of Marengo. During this battle, the 28th Line formed the advance guard of Jean Lannes' corps. Taupin continued fighting in the 1801 campaign in the Army of Italy. For his bravery at Montebello, he received a saber of honor on 24 January 1802. He was wounded in the thigh on 17 December 1802 at Larozotte. He became a member of the Légion d'honneur on 24 September 1803. He transferred to the 11th Line Infantry on 22 December 1803 as a major.

== Empire ==
=== Germany ===
Taupin became an officer of the Légion d'honneur on 14 June 1804. He was named colonel of the 103rd Line Infantry Regiment on 1 February 1805. In this capacity, he led his regiment in all the major campaigns from 1805 to 1807 and fought at the Battle of Dürenstein in 1805. The 103rd Line was in Honoré Theodore Maxime Gazan's division of the V Corps at Dürenstein. When the division was attacked by an overwhelmingly superior force of Russians and Austrians on 11 November, it was able to cut its way out of the trap, though it suffered losses of 2,300 men. He was wounded during the battle. Taupin became a commander of the Légion d'honneur on 25 December 1805.

The 1st, 2nd, and 3rd Battalions of Taupin's 103rd Regiment served in Gazan's 2nd Division of Lannes' V Corps at the Battle of Jena on 14 October 1806. In December, the 103rd Line fought in the Battle of Pułtusk. The V Corps missed the bloody Battle of Eylau because it and Nicolas Léonard Beker's dragoon division were covering Warsaw. The corps was under the command of Anne Jean Marie René Savary when it fought in the Battle of Ostrołęka on 15 February. The 103rd Line participated in this engagement in which Ivan Essen's Russian corps was defeated. Taupin was promoted to general of brigade on 21 February 1807 and raised to the peerage as a Baron of the Empire on 2 July 1808.

He was sent to Spain with the 2nd Division of the V Corps in September 1808. He was wounded in the right thigh on 27 December at the Second Siege of Zaragoza and sent home to France to recover. The War of the Fifth Coalition found him in command of a brigade in Marshal François Christophe de Kellermann's Reserve Corps, a rear-echelon formation based at Frankfurt. His command included the 4th Battalions of the 36th, 50th, and 75th Line Infantry Regiments, a total of 2,397 soldiers. The brigade formed part of Olivier Macoux Rivaud de la Raffiniere's division, along with the brigades of Alexandre Theodore Victor Lameth and Jean André Villeteaux. On 8 July 1809 the brigades of Taupin and Lameth with some attached units were defeated by Michael von Kienmayer's Austrians in the Battle of Gefrees. The 5,600-man French force was led by Jean-Andoche Junot.

=== Spain and Portugal: 1810–1812 ===
Taupin came to Spain as part of the 2nd Division under Marshal Jean-de-Dieu Soult. On 15 September 1810, he commanded a brigade in Bertrand Clausel's division of Junot's VIII Corps during the Battle of Bussaco. The 1,949-man brigade consisted of the 4th Battalions of the 15th Light, 46th Line, and 75th Line Infantry Regiments. The VIII Corps was part of Marshal André Masséna's Army of Portugal. While the French were engaged in the 1810 Siege of Ciudad Rodrigo Taupin vowed to shoot any French soldier that came into his brigade's area to forage for grain. During the invasion, Taupin's brigade was in the advance guard and began to pillage Coimbra as soon as that city was occupied. When other French officers complained, Junot refused to do anything. Taupin served throughout the 1810–11 invasion of Portugal.

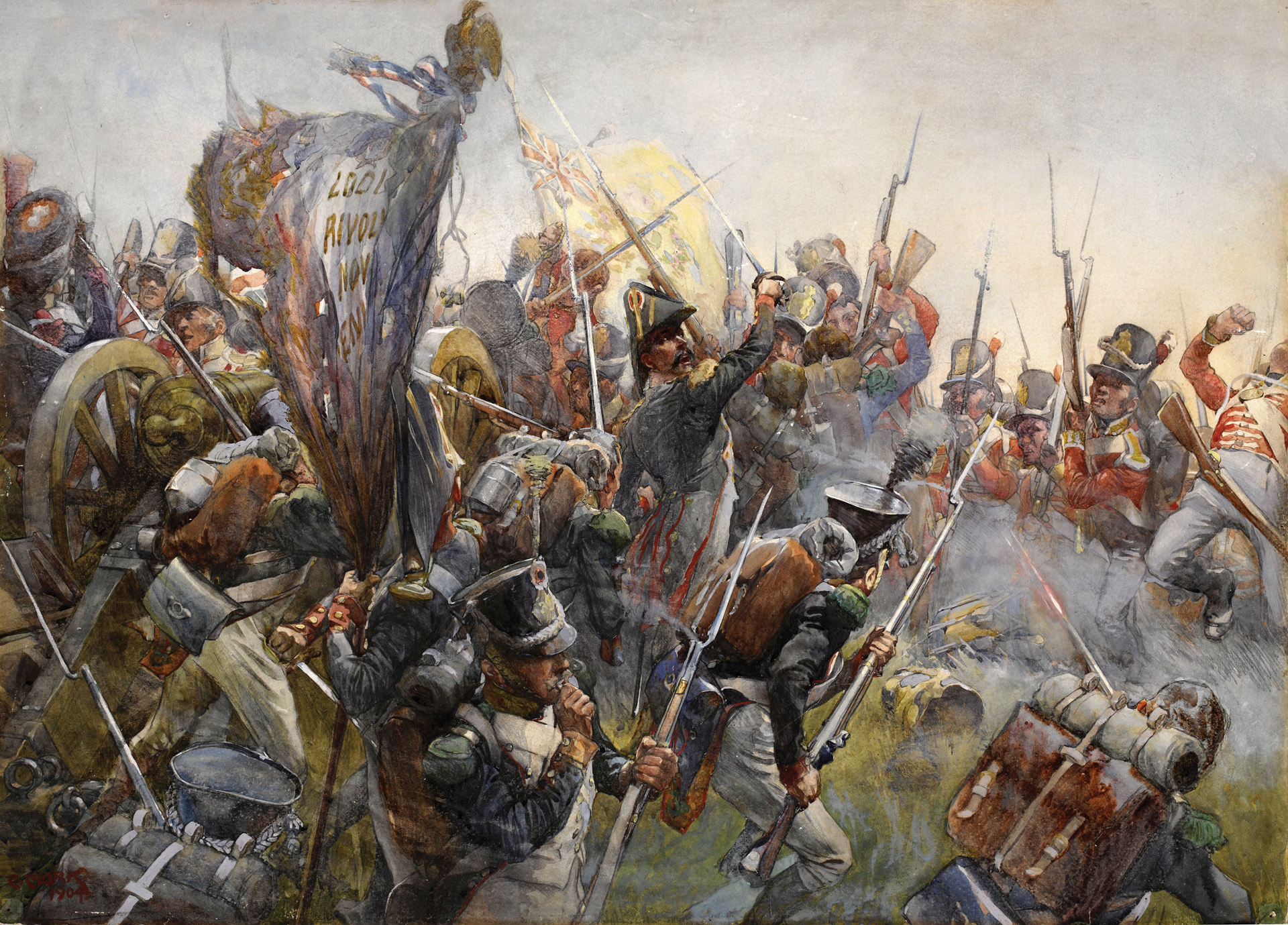
The Battle of Salamanca

Taupin led a brigade in Julien Augustin Joseph Mermet's division at the Battle of Fuentes de Oñoro on 3–5 May 1811. The brigade comprised the 1st, 2nd and 4th Battalions of the 50th and 59th Line Infantry Regiments and was part of Louis Henri Loison's VI Corps. Mermet's division was part of Masséna's flank attack on 5 May. This turned the Allied right flank, but Arthur Wellesley, Viscount Wellington placed his right flank in a new position which Massena did not attack. In the summer of 1812, Taupin called his officers together at a village church and lectured from the pulpit about the overuse of horses and mules in the infantry. The veteran recalled that in 1793 he had a haversack to carry his belongings and a stone for a pillow. He railed against officers keeping riding horses and using too many mules to carry their baggage. Ironically, Taupin himself had six mules to carry his personal baggage.

At the Battle of Salamanca in July 1812, Taupin led a brigade in Antoine Francois Brenier de Montmorand's 6th Division. The 2,706-strong brigade included two battalions of the 17th Light and three battalions of the 65th Line Infantry Regiments. Brenier's division arrived on the field as Antoine Louis Popon de Maucune's division was being ridden down by a British heavy cavalry brigade under John Le Marchant. Attacked by Le Marchant's horsemen, Brenier's other brigade, consisting of the 22nd Line, shot down one-fourth of the troopers of the leading squadron. However, the British dragoons rode into it and routed it. Le Marchant was killed in the struggle, shot through the spine. In the battle, Taupin's two regiments sustained lighter losses than 21 officers lost by the 22nd Line. The 17th Light lost nine officers while the 65th lost only three. In the Burgos Campaign during October 1812, Taupin commanded the 3rd Division of the Army of Portugal which was formerly led by Claude François Ferey. The division was made up of two battalions each of the 31st Light, 26th Line and 70th Line plus three battalions of the 47th Line Infantry Regiment.

=== Spain and France: 1813 ===
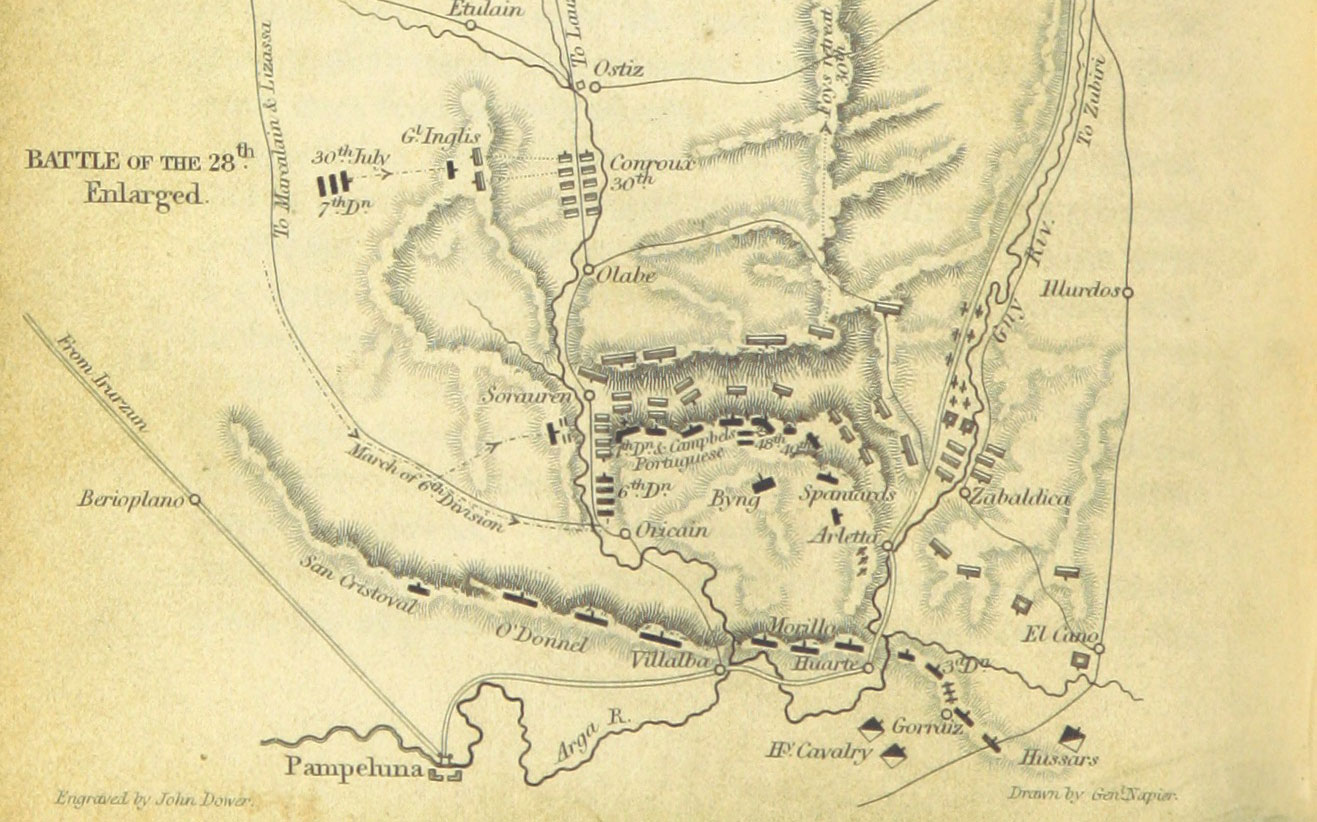
Battle of Sorauren: Taupin's division attacked the position marked "4th Dn & Campbels Portuguese".

On 28 January 1813 Taupin was promoted to general of division. After the Burgos Campaign, the French armies spread out to re-occupy Spain. That winter, Napoleon ordered the Army of Portugal to be placed at the disposition of Bertrand Clausel's Army of the North to suppress the Spanish guerillas. On 30 March Taupin's division moved to Vitoria to assist the Army of the North. In mid-May, while Clausel attacked the guerillas under Francisco Espoz y Mina with three divisions, Taupin's troops guarded Navarre. The Battle of Vitoria on 21 June 1813 marked the end of the French Kingdom of Spain. Clausel's four divisions belatedly neared the battlefield on 22 June before turning away after hearing rumors of the defeat. Though pursued for a time by Wellington's troops, Clausel retreated via Jaca over the Somport Pass on 12 July. After Marshal Jean-de-Dieu Soult reorganized the army in July, Taupin assumed command of the 8th Division. His 5,981-man division included the same four regiments from October 1812 plus the newly-added 9th Light and the 88th Line. The brigade commanders were Jean-Pierre Béchaud and Jean Lecamus.

In the Battle of the Pyrenees in late July 1813, Taupin's division fought in Clausel's corps and suffered 131 killed, 1,045 wounded and 26 captured. His division was not engaged in the Battle of Roncesvalles on 25 July. In the Battle of Sorauren on 28 July, Taupin's whole division launched an assault on the hill of Oricain with Lecamus' brigade on the right and Béchaud's brigade on the left. Normally light companies were used to skirmish. Since Taupin employed his grenadier companies also, the French skirmish line was twice as strong as usual. Lecamus' brigade was repulsed before it reached the crest, but Béchaud's troops briefly established themselves on the crest before being driven off.

In the Battle of San Marcial on 31 August, Clausel's divisions crossed the Bidassoa River at dawn, covered by fog. After the mist cleared, the divisions of Taupin and Jean Barthélemy Darmagnac began pressing back William Inglis' British brigade and a Portuguese brigade. At 3:00 pm Clausel received Soult's order to withdraw just as a very heavy rainstorm began. By the time the retreating divisions reached the Bidassoa, the river was rising dangerously. The first brigades of both Taupin and Darmagnac got across but the second brigades became stranded on the far bank with Edmé-Martin Vandermaesen's division. Vandermaesen marched upstream to the bridge at Bera (Vera) and at 2:00 am on 1 September began making desperate attacks against the 100 British riflemen defending the span. The French finally dislodged the defenders and escaped, though Vandermaesen and many others were killed.

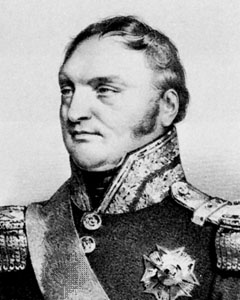
Bertrand Clausel

In the Battle of the Bidassoa on 7 October 1813, Taupin's 4,700-man division held the ridge north of Bera. It was attacked by 6,500 soldiers from the British Light Division and Francisco de Longa's Spanish division advancing north from Bera. On the right flank, Béchaud's brigade held the Bayonette Spur which included the Saint Benôit fort and the Bayonette Redoubt. Lecamus' brigade (under Colonel Cambriel) defended the Hog's Back and the Vera Pass on the left flank. Allied forces led by James Kempt drove back Cambriel's brigade rather easily and seized the crest while sustaining only 78 casualties. John Colborne's brigade had more difficult time and its first attack on the Saint Benôit fort was repulsed. The French chased their enemies downhill and were out of order when the British supporting battalion appeared. The Allies returned to the attack and ousted the French from the fort. Then they fought their way to the top of the spur where they overran the redoubt also. Colborne's brigade lost 302 men killed or wounded. British officers remarked that the French soldiers fought less stubbornly than in the past. Half of the total French casualties of 1,673 men were in Taupin's division.

During the Battle of Nivelle on 10 November 1813, Taupin's division held the second line. By 10:00 am Clausel's two front line divisions were driven back into the second line. When attacked again the two broken divisions began to unravel and Clausel asked Taupin to send help. When Taupin's line was assaulted, most of his soldiers fought poorly and their fortifications were quickly overrun. Taupin blamed the defeat on the fact that his reserves had been sent away to help the other divisions. The battalion of the 88th Line in the Signals Redoubt repulsed several attacks by the British 52nd Foot but it was soon isolated by the retreat of other units. At length the 88th Line was forced to surrender and disappeared from the French order of battle. By 2:00 pm Clausel's corps was forced back behind the Nivelle River. Taupin's division lost 68 killed, 375 wounded and 498 captured.

After the Nivelle the 8th Division was suppressed, but Soult appointed Taupin as commander of the 4th Division to replace Nicolas François Conroux who had been killed. The division, which counted 6,098 soldiers, included two battalions each of the 12th Light, 32nd Line and 43rd Line and one battalion each of the 45th, 55th and 58th Line. Though the Battle of the Nive lasted from 9 to 13 December 1813, Taupin's division was only lightly engaged, sustaining only 197 casualties. The 4th Division was involved in the advance on Arcangues on 10 December, but the Allied position was so strong that Clausel declined to press the attack.

=== France: 1814 ===
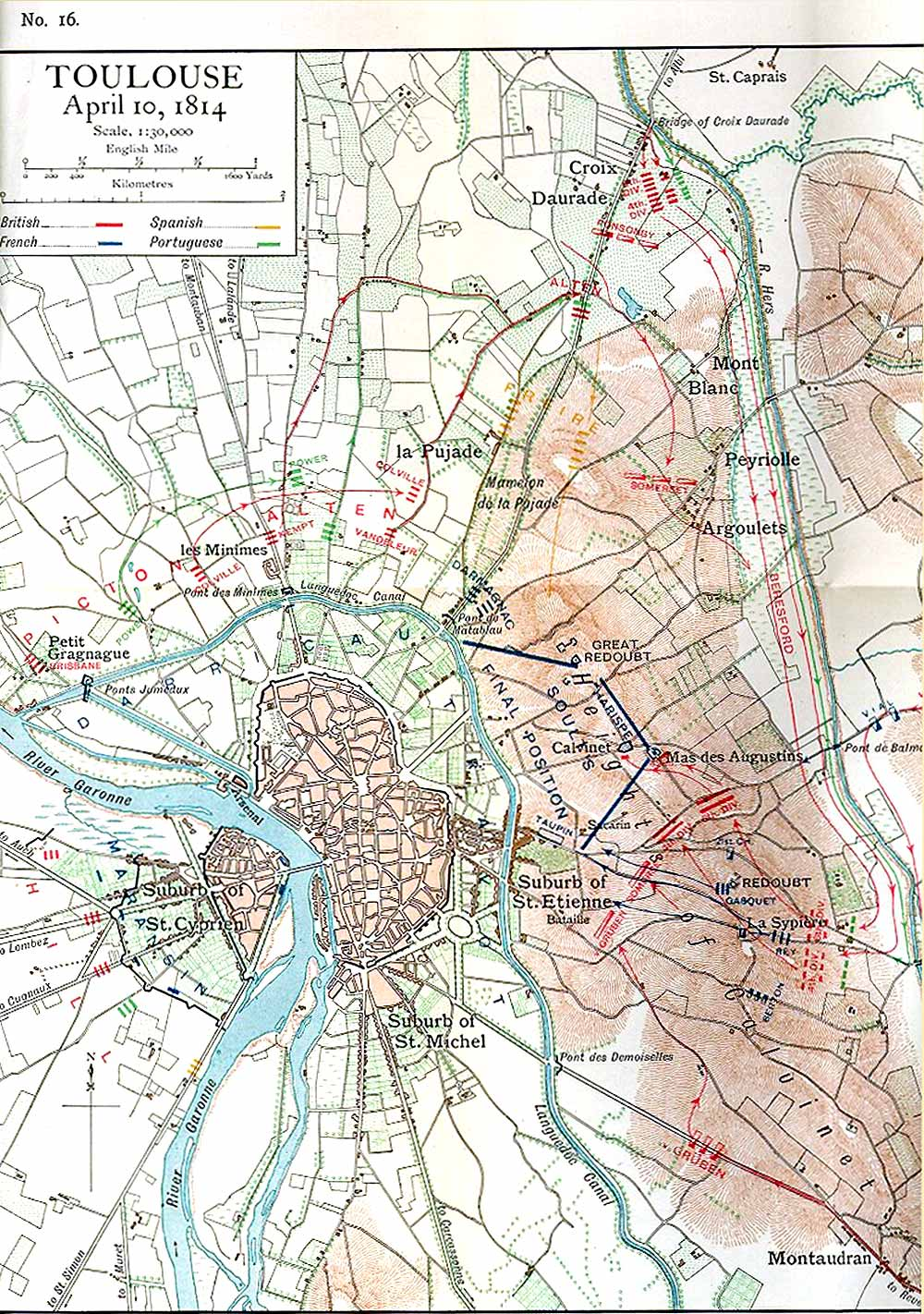
Battle of Toulouse map shows the attacks of Rey's and Gasquet's brigades at lower right.

At the Battle of Orthez on 26 February 1814, Taupin's division held the French right flank at the Plassotte Knoll overlooking the village and church of Saint-Boès. Wellington planned to turn the French right flank using Lowry Cole's British 4th Division. Soon after 8:30 am, Cole's leading brigade under Robert Ross seized the church and village, but it was unable to advance beyond the village. When Cole brought up an artillery battery to suppress the French guns, the battery commander was killed and two of its guns were knocked out. Cole renewed the assault, throwing in José Vasconcellos' Portuguese brigade on the right of Ross. However, the second attack was also beaten back, Ross going down with a wound and the Allied soldiers falling back to the village. Presently Taupin counterattacked and his men recaptured part of the village. Despite being reinforced by the Portuguese 1st Caçadores from the Light Division, Cole's entire line soon collapsed and his soldiers abandoned Saint-Boès.

His initial plan thwarted, Wellington ordered a general assault on the French position at 11:30 am. The attack on Taupin's division was renewed by the British 7th Division under George Townshend Walker. Supported by a Portuguese brigade on the right and two battalions on the left, Walker launched the 6th Foot, followed by three more battalions at Taupin's defenses. In addition Wellington sent the 52nd Foot to turn Taupin's left flank. By this time the rest of the French army was retreating. After a four-hour defense, Taupin's tired men withdrew; they were the last French soldiers to relinquish their position. At Orthez, Taupin's division lost 77 killed, 463 wounded and 51 captured. Cole's division suffered 304 British and 295 Portuguese casualties, while Walker's division reported 368 British casualties. In the Light Division, the 52nd Foot sustained 89 casualties and the 1st Caçadores lost 47.

At the Battle of Toulouse on 10 April, Taupin's division consisted of two brigades under Jean-Pierre-Antoine Rey (3,039 men) and Joseph Gasquet (2,416) men). Wellington ordered William Carr Beresford to take the British 4th and 6th Divisions on a flank march alongside the Ers River to strike Soult's right flank on Mont Rave. The route being through muddy fields, Beresford's march was considerably delayed, causing the Spanish corps to attack prematurely and suffer a repulse. When Beresford finally reached the extreme French right, his six brigades began to advance up Mont Rave in three lines of two brigades each. Soult ordered Taupin's division to change position and then charge downhill against the Allied forces. Rey's brigade was on the right with the 12th Light leading while Gasquet's was on the left with the 47th Line leading. The outer flanks were supported by cavalry. Rather than forming his battalions into line, Taupin sent the two columns marching downhill in a narrow formation. They advanced in battalion column with the battalions one behind the other and were shot to pieces by their British opponents deployed in line. Taupin was fatally shot alongside Rey's leading battalion while trying to encourage his soldiers. The French soldiers panicked and fled uphill, followed by the British. Seeing Rey's brigade in flight, Gasquet's brigade also ran away and the soldiers manning the Sypière Redoubt fled.

Taupin died at 11:00 am and later that day his body was left in the Cathedral of Saint-Etienne. On 12 April the official couriers arrived from Paris with news that Napoleon had abdicated and the war was over. The name Taupin appears on the west side of the Arc de Triomphe.
