= Ecluse Saint-Pierre =

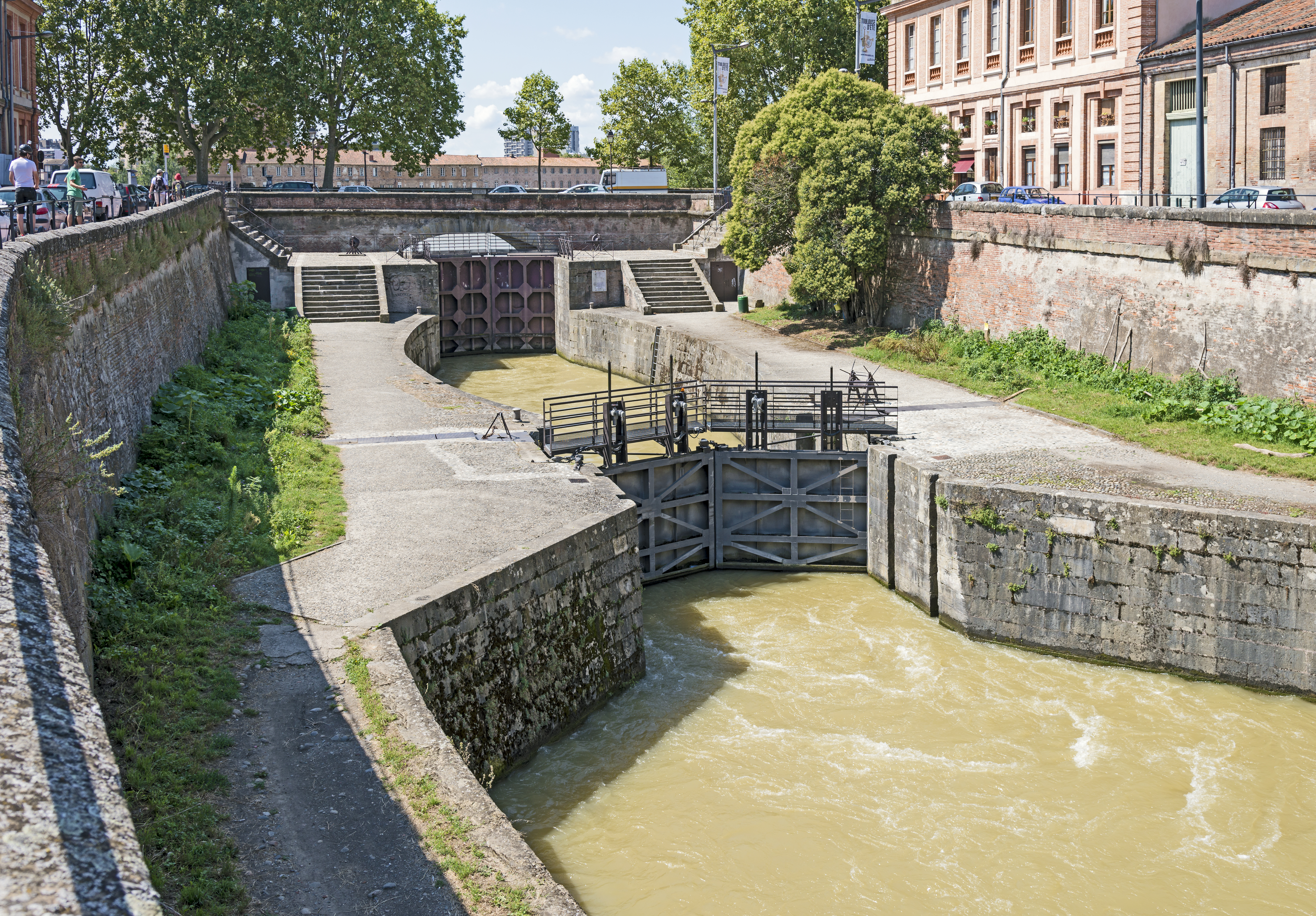
Écluse Saint-Pierre

The écluse Saint-Pierre (French pronunciation: [eklyz sɛ̃ pjɛʁ]; Occitan: Barratge de Sant Pèire) is one of two locks on the Canal de Brienne. Also known as Garonne lock, in French: Ecluse de Garonne.
