= Port Saint-Sauveur =

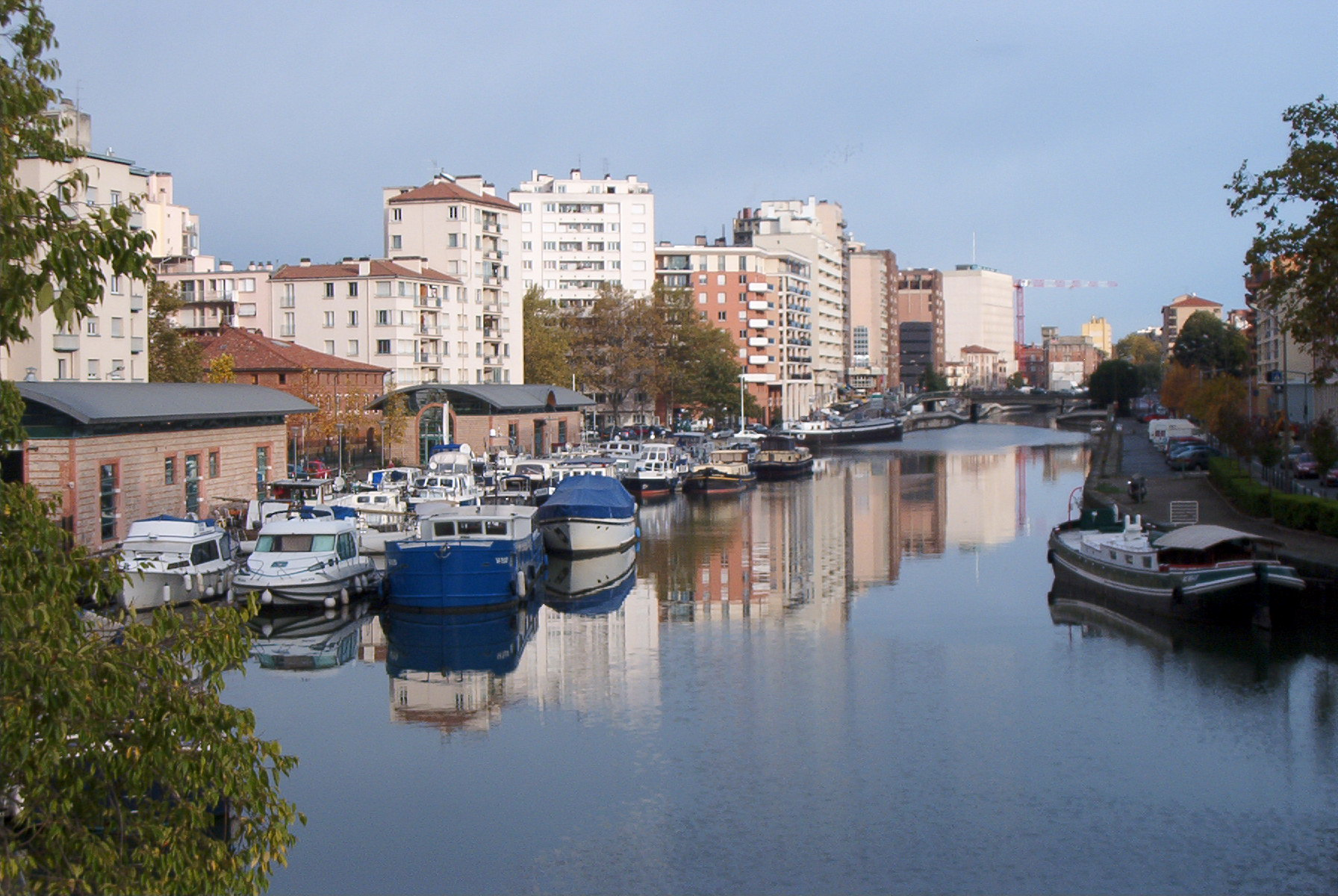
43.59530°N 1.45629°E

The Port Saint-Sauveur (Occitan: Pòrt de Sant Salvador) is one of the two river ports located in Toulouse on the Canal du Midi. The other being the Port de l'Embouchure.
