= Brienne Canal =

Canal in Toulouse, France

Canal de Brienne
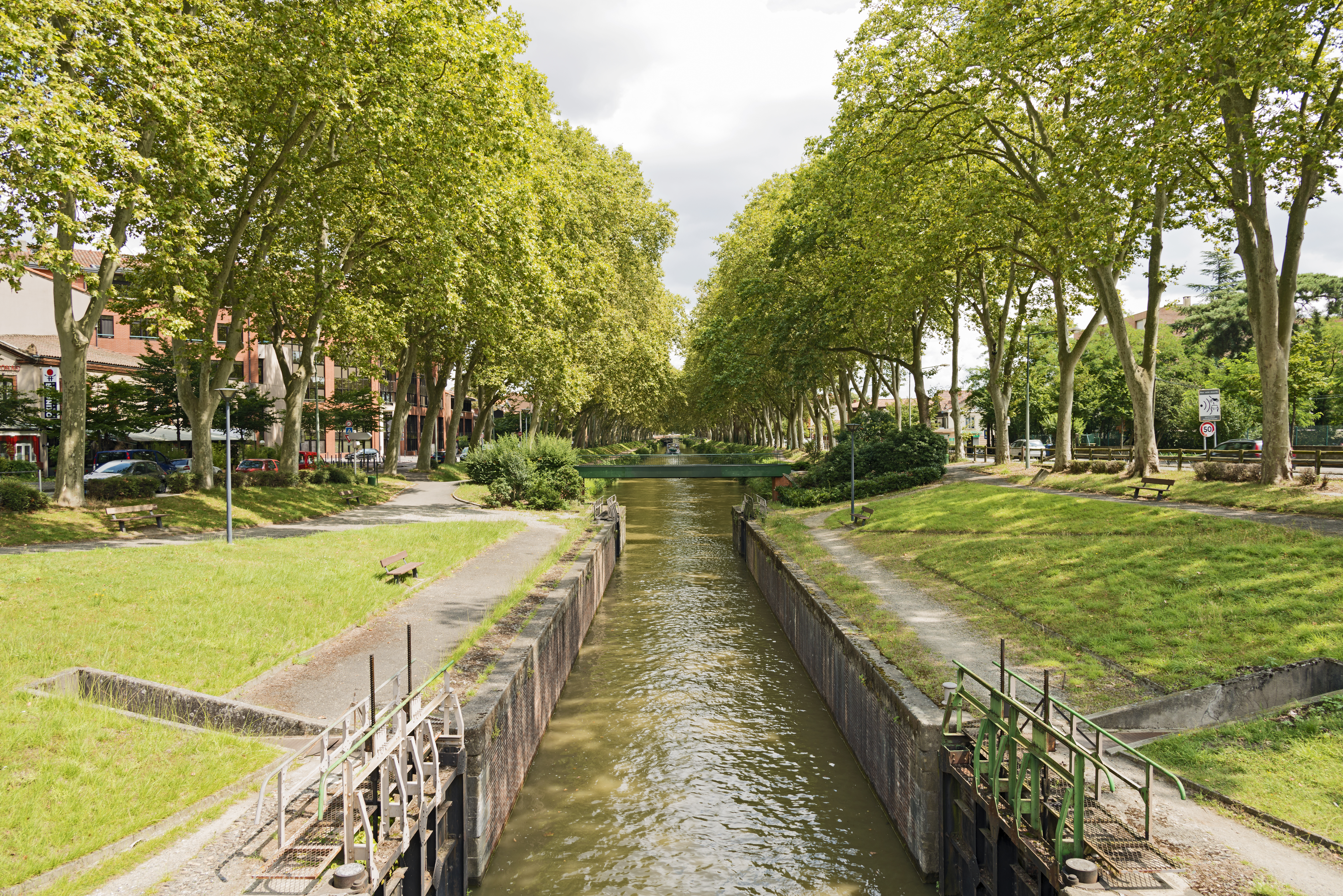
- Canal de Brienne

Specifications
- Length: 1,560 m (5,120 ft)
- Locks: 2

History
- Date of first use: 14 April 1776

Geography
- Start point: Toulouse
- End point: Toulouse
- Beginning coordinates: 43.60416°N 1.43429°E
- Ending coordinates: 43.61060°N 1.41880°E
- Connects to: Canal du Midi, Garonne River, Canal de Garonne

The Canal de Brienne (French pronunciation: [kanal də bʁijɛn]), also known as Canal de Saint-Pierre ([kanal də sɛ̃ pjɛʁ]), is a French canal connecting the Garonne River with the Canal du Midi and the Canal de Garonne. It has two locks. The lock opening to the Garonne is known as Ecluse Saint-Pierre. The lock nearer to the Canal du Midi usually stands open.

The canal is in the centre of Toulouse, in the Midi-Pyrénées region of France. It runs for only 1,560 m (0.97 mi) from its source at Bazacle on the Garonne to its terminal basin where it meets the Canal du Midi. At the joining with the Canal du Midi is the Ponts Jumeaux (English: twin bridges).

The canal was inaugurated on 14 April 1776. It was intended to carry water from the Garonne to the Canal latéral à la Garonne and provide a navigable route to the port de la Daurade, situated in the centre of Toulouse on the Garonne.

It owes its name to Etienne Charles de Loménie de Brienne (1727–1794), archbishop of Toulouse.

== See also ==
- List of canals in France
