= Barbery, Oise =

Barbery
- Commune
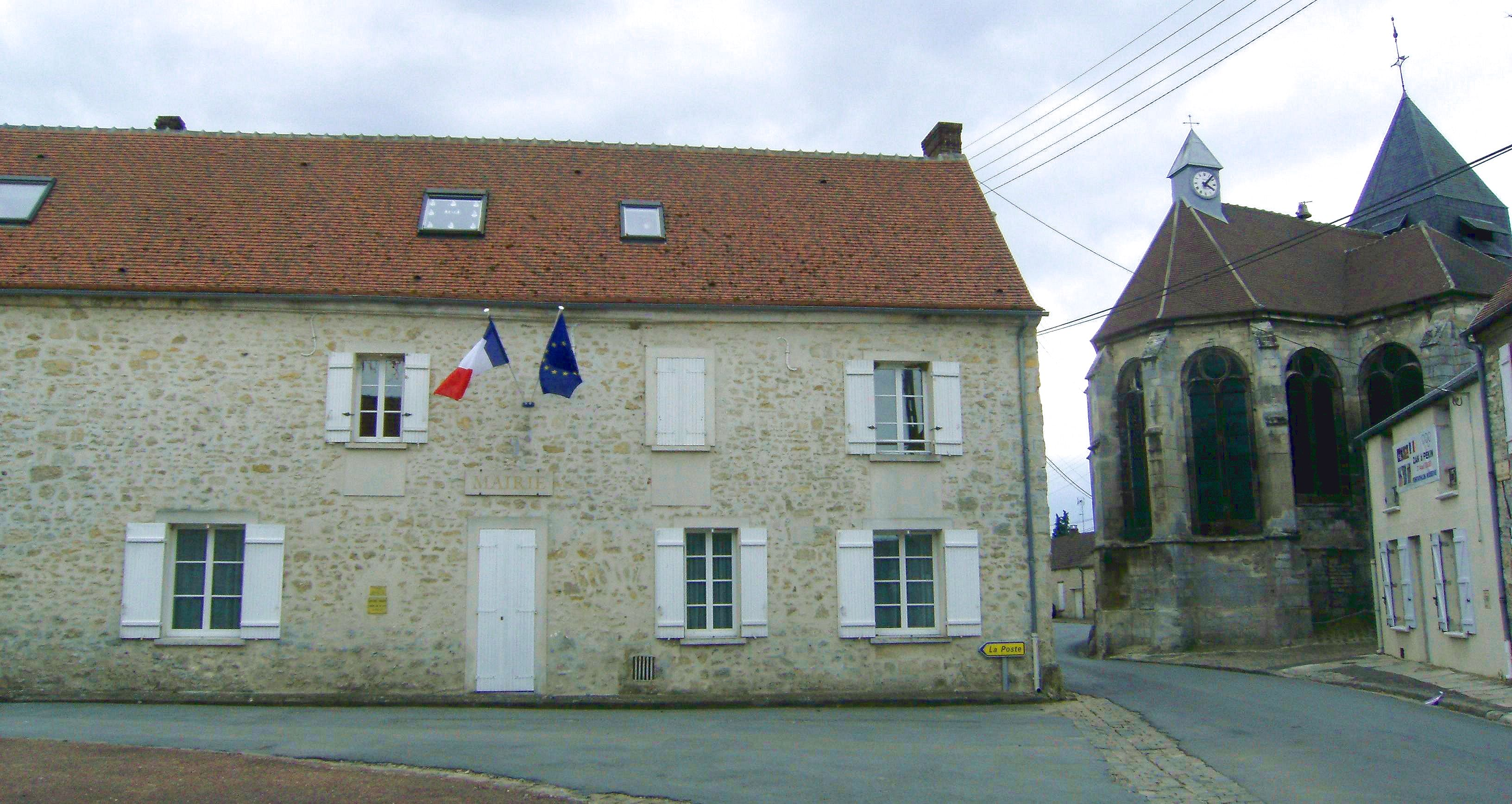
- The town hall in Barbery
- Location of Barbery
- Location within France Location within Hauts-de-France
- Coordinates: 49°13′23″N 2°40′09″E
- Country: France
- Region: Hauts-de-France
- Department: Oise
- Arrondissement: Senlis
- Canton: Pont-Sainte-Maxence
- Intercommunality: Senlis Sud Oise

Government
  - Mayor (2020–2026): Dimitri Roland
- Area^{1}: 7.6 km^{2} (2.9 sq mi)
- Elevation: 86 m (282 ft)
- Highest elevation: 102 m (335 ft)
- Lowest elevation: 68 m (223 ft)
- Population (2023): 528
  - Density: 69/km^{2} (180/sq mi)
- Time zone: UTC+01:00 (CET)
  - Summer (DST): UTC+02:00 (CEST)
- INSEE/Postal code: 60045 /60810
- ^{1} French Land Register data, which excludes lakes, ponds, glaciers > 1 km^{2} (0.386 sq mi or 247 acres) and river estuaries.

Barbery (French pronunciation: [baʁbəʁi]) is a commune in the Oise department in northern France.

== Population ==
Historical population
Year	Pop.	±% p.a.
1968	531	—
1975	480	−1.43%
1982	452	−0.85%
1990	483	+0.83%
1999	518	+0.78%
2007	524	+0.14%
2012	539	+0.57%
2017	572	+1.20%
2023	528	−1.33%
Source: INSEE

== See also ==
- Communes of the Oise department
