= Bazacle =

Coordinates: 43.60436°N 1.43206°E

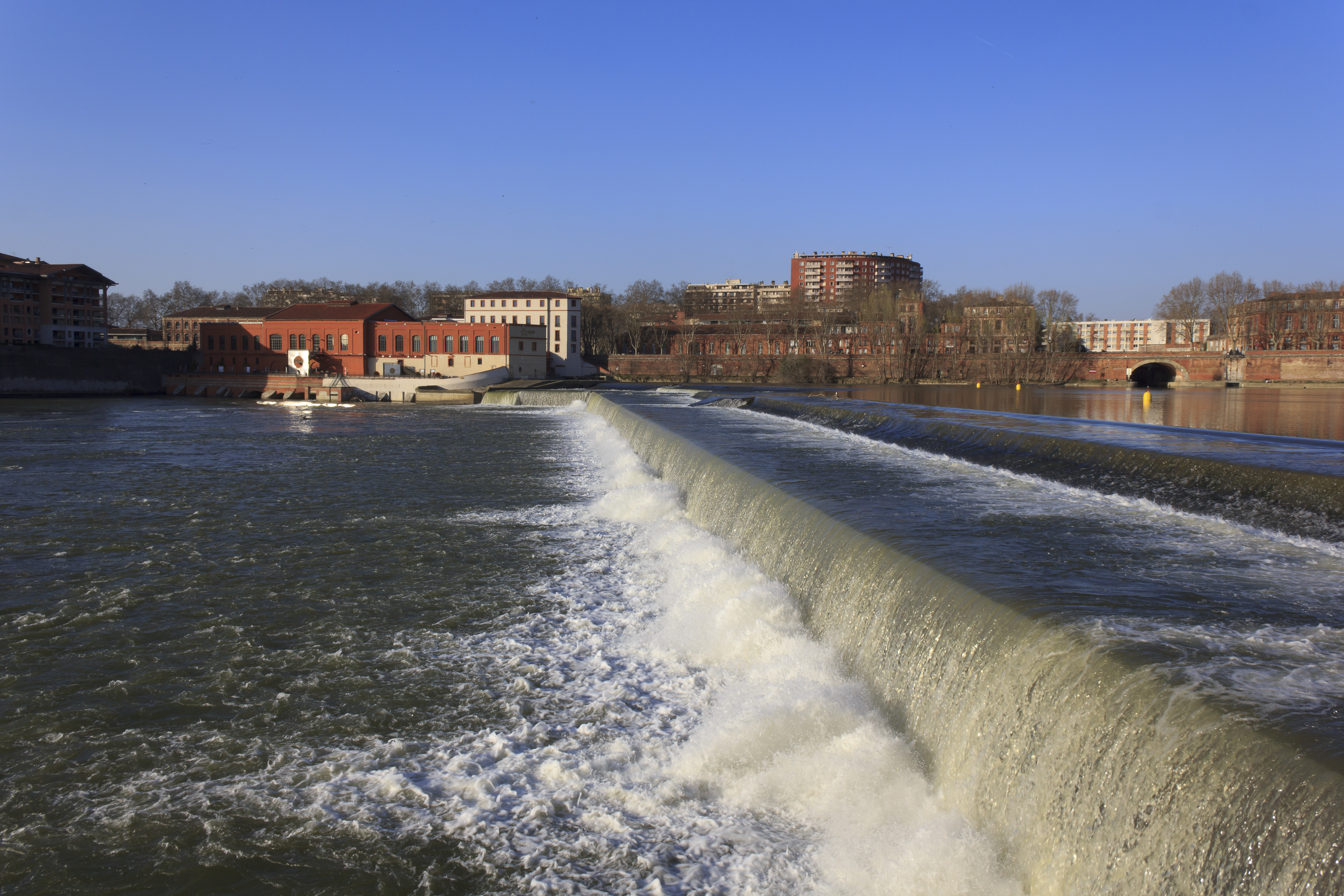
The chaussée du Bazacle

The Bazacle is a structure in and on the banks of the River Garonne in the French city of Toulouse.

It originated as a ford across the river Garonne, used from the 12th century onwards. The name bazacle comes from the Latin word vadaculum, meaning "little ford". The first bridge across the Garonne was built here, where the water was shallowest.

In 1190, with the permission of comte Raymond V of Toulouse, a sort of dam, the chaussée, and adjacent mills were built. These mills were cited by Rabelais in the sixteenth century as being the most powerful in the world.

In about 1250, the original undertaking was underwritten by a group of local seigneurs, who shared the profits according to the number of shares they possessed. The shares of this society (the Société des Moulins du Bazacle, or Bazacle Milling Company) came to be traded on the open market in Toulouse and their value fluctuated according to the profitability of the mills. The company survived until 1946 when it was nationalized and is sometimes claimed as the earliest example of a Joint-stock company.

A hydroelectric power station was built in 1890 on the same spot to supply Toulouse with electricity. In 1946, Électricité de France bought the plant. Both old and modern turbines can be viewed in working state to this day. There is a fish ladder in the river, allowing fish to swim through.

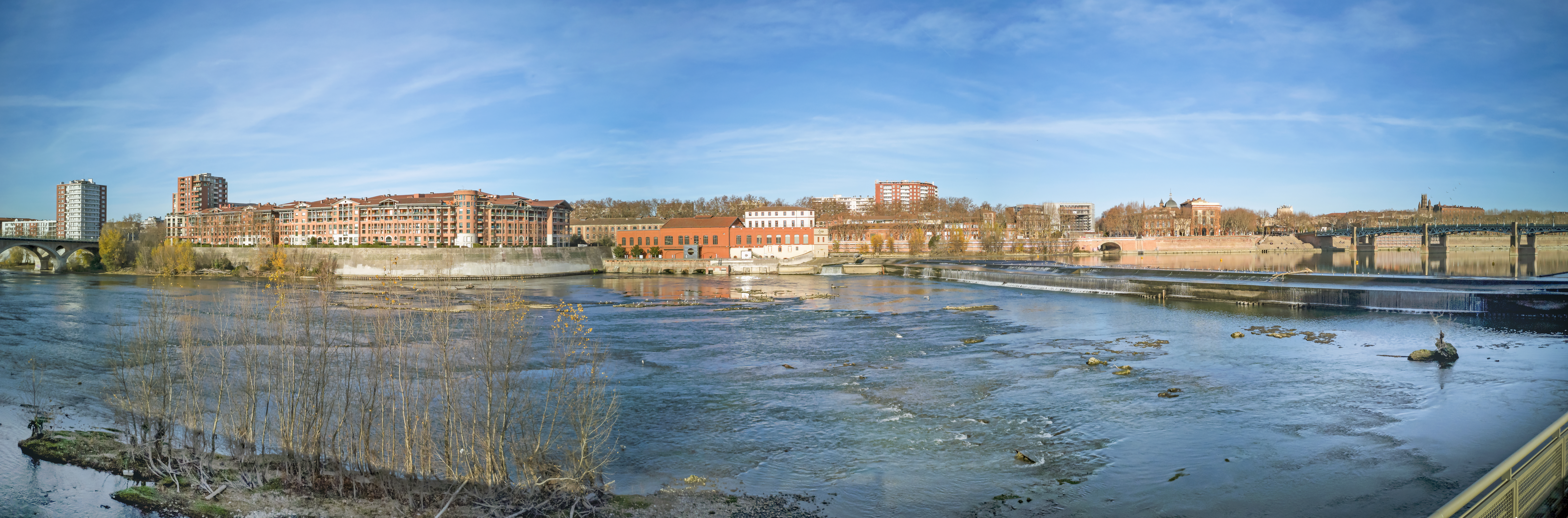
Panoramic view of the right bank of the Garonne at Bazacle in Toulouse.
