= Battle of Garris =

1814 battle of the campaign in south-west France

- Part of the campaign in south-west France
Date	15 February 1814
Location	Garris, Basses-Pyrénées 43°20′36″N 1°03′36″W
Result	Coalition victory

Belligerents
United Kingdom; Portugal; Spain	France

Commanders and leaders
(United Kingdom of Great Britain and Ireland) Arthur Wellesley (United Kingdom of Great Britain and Ireland) Rowland Hill (Kingdom of Portugal) Carlos Lecor (Spain) Pablo Morillo	(First French Empire) Jean Isidore Harispe

Strength
11,000	7,000

Casualties and losses
170 killed or wounded	300 killed or wounded 200 captured
- Location within Europe

Peninsular War:
Campaign in south-west France
current battle

The Battle of Garris (also known as the Battle of Saint-Palais) was fought on 15 February 1814 and saw an Allied force under the direct command of General Arthur Wellesley, Marquess Wellington attack General of Division Jean Harispe's French division. The French defenders were driven back into the town of Saint-Palais in confusion. Because of this minor victory, the Allies were able to secure a crossing over the Bidouze River during this clash from the final stages of the Peninsular War.

In the Battle of the Nive on 9–13 December 1813, Marshal Jean-de-Dieu Soult's army failed to drive Wellington's forces away from Bayonne. After the Nive, bad weather imposed a 2-month pause in military operations, during which time the French confined the Allied forces to an area south and west of the fortresses of Bayonne and Saint-Jean-Pied-de-Port. To break out of the region, Wellington launched an offensive toward the east in February, pressing back Soult's left wing. A column under Rowland Hill encountered Harispe's division at Garris. The next action was the Battle of Orthez.

== Background ==
In the Battle of the Nive near Bayonne on 9–13 December 1813, Wellington with 36,000 British and 23,000 Portuguese defeated Soult with 65,933 troops. French casualties were 5,947 and 16 guns while Allied losses numbered 4,662. Another authority placed Allied losses at 5,000 while pointing out that the French lost 2,000 allied German troops who defected to the Allies. This action marked the end of the fighting for the year. Soult had found Wellington's army divided by the Nive River but failed to inflict a crippling blow. Afterward, the French withdrew into Bayonne and winter quarters.

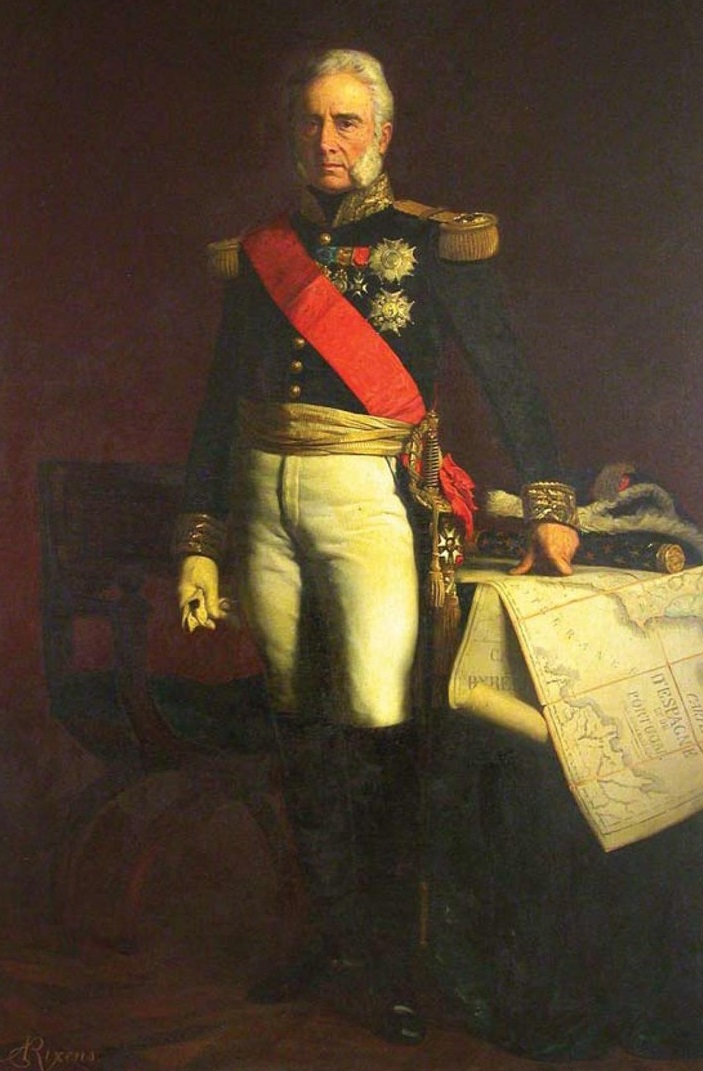
Jean Isidore Harispe

Bad weather prevented Wellington's army from moving for the next two months. Heavy rains began soon after the fighting stopped, rendering the roads impassable and washing away the Allies' temporary bridges across the Nive. The Coalition allies begged the British commander to continue his campaign but Wellington politely declined to mount an offensive when the weather was so bad. He explained it would ruin his army to no purpose. After the Battle of Nivelle on 10 November 1813, Wellington's Spanish troops had run amok in captured French villages. Not wishing to provoke a guerilla war by French civilians, the British commander rigorously discouraged his British and Portuguese troops from plundering and sent most of his Spanish soldiers home. Only Pablo Morillo's Spanish division was retained since the men were regularly paid and fed by the British government. Wellington's policy soon paid off when his soldiers found it unnecessary to guard the roads in his army's rear areas.

In January 1814, Soult's army was reduced by three divisions and one brigade when Napoleon demanded reinforcements to help defend eastern France. Transferred to the Campaign in Northeast France were the 5,428-man 7th Infantry Division led by Jean François Leval, the 5,587-strong 9th Infantry Division commanded by Pierre François Xavier Boyer, a 2,866-man dragoon division under Anne-François-Charles Trelliard and a 554-man dragoon brigade directed by Louis Ernest Joseph Sparre.

Remaining with Soult were the 4,600-man 1st Division under Maximilien Sébastien Foy, the 5,500-man 2nd Division led by Jean Barthélemy Darmagnac, the 5,300-man 3rd Division commanded by Louis Jean Nicolas Abbé, the 5,600-man 4th Division directed by Eloi Charlemagne Taupin, the 5,000-man 5th Division commanded by Jean-Pierre Maransin, the 5,200-man 6th Division under Eugène-Casimir Villatte, the 6,600-man 8th Division led by Jean Isidore Harispe and the 3,800-man cavalry division under Pierre Benoît Soult. Marshal Soult's command also included 7,300 gunners, engineers and wagon drivers plus the 8,800-strong garrison of Bayonne and the 2,400-strong garrison of Saint-Jean-Pied-de-Port. The original 8th Division was suppressed after the Battle of Nivelle. It was reconstituted by adding the brigade of Marie Auguste Paris, borrowed from Marshal Louis-Gabriel Suchet's army, to two brigades from Villatte's Reserve.

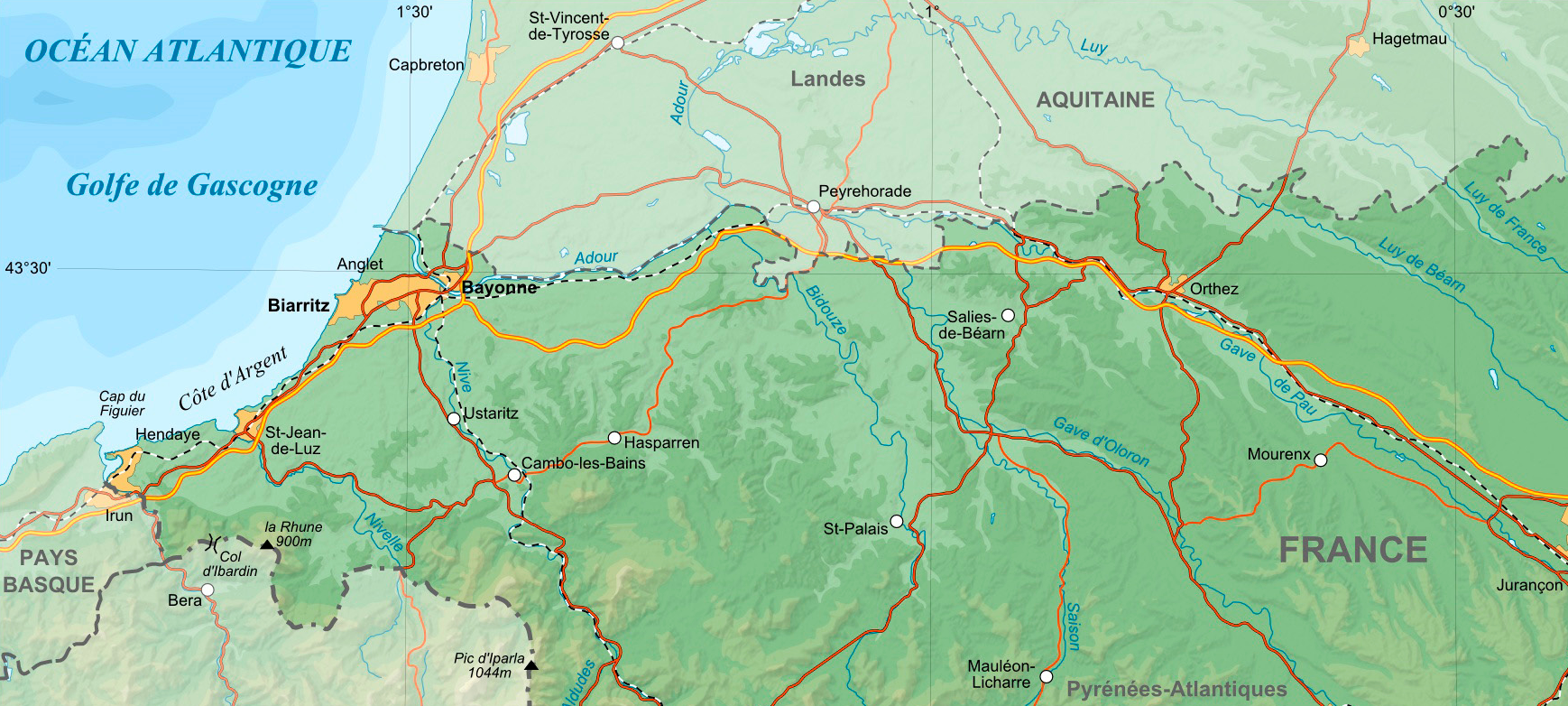
Map of Pyrenées-Atlantiques department shows Bayonne on the coast at left, Saint-Palais on the Bidouze at lower center and Soult's headquarters at Peyrehorade at upper center.

Wellington's army included the 6,898-man 1st Division under Kenneth Howard, the 7,780-man 2nd Division led by William Stewart, the 6,626-man 3rd Division commanded by Thomas Picton, the 5,952-man 4th Division directed by Lowry Cole, the 4,553-man 5th Division under Andrew Hay, the 5,571-man 6th Division led by Henry Clinton, the 5,643-man 7th Division commanded by George Townshend Walker, the 3,480-man Light Division directed by Charles Alten, the 4,465-man Portuguese Division under Carlos Lecor and the 4,924-man Spanish Division led by Morillo. Stapleton Cotton commanded three light cavalry brigades under Henry Fane, 765 sabers, Hussey Vivian, 989 sabers and Edward Somerset, 1,619 sabers. In addition there were three independent infantry brigades, 1,816 British under Matthew Whitworth-Aylmer, 2,185 Portuguese led by John Wilson and 1,614 Portuguese directed by Thomas Bradford.

Soult established his headquarters in Peyrehorade and posted his divisions in a line running from the fortress of Bayonne on the west to the fortress of Saint-Jean-Pied-de-Port on the southeast. He believed that Wellington would try to surround Bayonne by crossing the river Adour east of the city. To prevent this, the French marshal assigned three divisions to hold the line of the Adour from Bayonne to Port-de-Lanne. Facing southeast, four divisions defended the river Joyeuse from the Adour to the village of Hélette. Cavalry outposts covered the gap between Hélette and Saint-Jean-Pied-de-Port, which was blockaded by Spanish guerillas under Francisco Espoz y Mina. Soult planned to strike the Allies when they tried to push across the Adour, but Wellington had other plans. The British commander planned to use the corps of John Hope, 4th Earl of Hopetoun against Bayonne, while pressing east with his other two corps in an effort to draw Soult's army away from Bayonne.

Soult could muster 60,000 soldiers and 77 guns while Wellington was able to put more than 70,000 into the field. The rains stopped in the second week of February and Wellington's began his offensive on 14 February. On the right flank was Rowland Hill's 20,000-man corps, including the 2nd Division, the Portuguese Division, Morillo's Spaniards and Fane's cavalry brigade. Hill was temporarily assigned the 3rd Division. On Hill's left was the 25,400-man corps of William Beresford with the 4th, 6th, 7th and Light Divisions plus the cavalry brigades of Vivian and Somerset. Hill's main column headed east for Hélette while Picton's 3rd Division marched toward Bonloc on the north and Morillo's division moved through the foothills farther south. In the face of this threat, Harispe's division at Hélette abandoned the line of the Joyeuse and fell back toward the Bidouze River at Saint-Palais. With his left flank uncovered, Villatte, facing Picton's 3rd Division, also backpedaled to the Bidouze.

== Battle ==
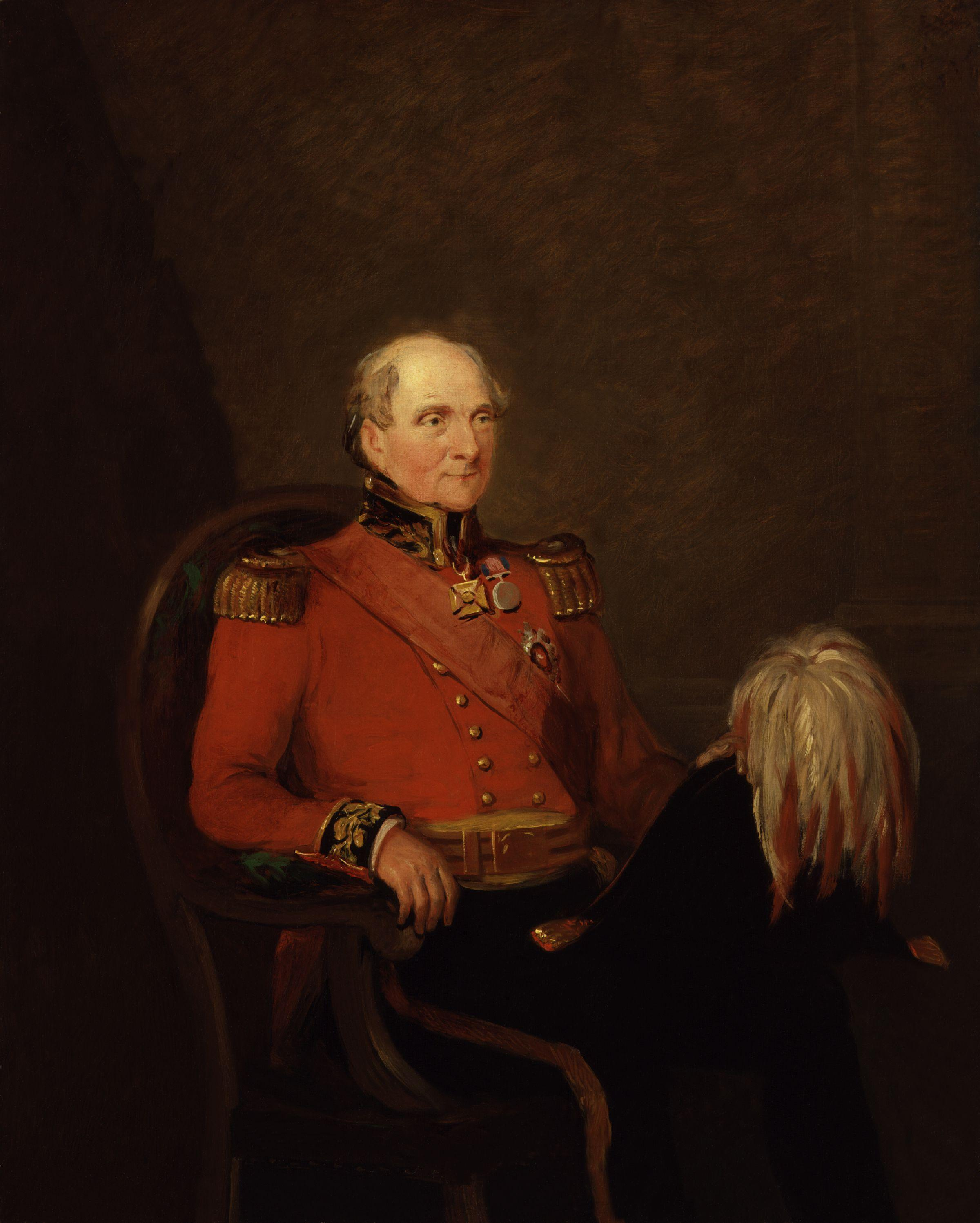
Rowland Hill

Just west of Saint-Palais, Harispe found a defensible position at Garris. He deployed his division on a long ridge and awaited the Allied onset. The only escape route was the single bridge over the Bidouze at Saint-Palais. Late in the afternoon of 15 February, William Henry Pringle's brigade at the front of Hill's corps, came up to the position but merely skirmished with the French. The soldiers were tired from their long march and looked forward to camping for the evening. Suddenly, an aide-de-camp of Wellington galloped up and demanded, "Take that hill before dark". The troops quickly formed into close column and advanced toward the French.

Harispe deployed about 7,000 troops. They were two battalions each of the 9th, 25th and 34th Light Infantry and one battalion each of the 45th, 81st, 115th 116th and 117th Line Infantry Regiments. Against them, Wellington and Hill brought about 11,000 men, including two battalions of Pringle's brigade, the 1st Battalions of the 28th Foot and 39th Foot. In addition, there were Lecor's two Portuguese brigades under Hippolita Da Costa and John Buchan. Da Costa's brigade consisted of two battalions each of the 2nd and 14th Portuguese Infantry Regiments while Buchan's brigade was made up of two battalions each of the 4th and 10th Portuguese Infantry Regiments and the 10th Caçadores (light) Battalion.

Stewart's 2nd Division included three British and one Portuguese brigades, the 1st under Edward Barnes, the 2nd under the Earl of Strafford, the 3rd under Pringle and the Portuguese under Henry Hardinge. Barnes led the 1st Battalions of the 50th Foot, 71st Highlanders and 92nd Highlanders. Byng was in charge of the 1st Battalions of the 3rd Foot, 57th Foot and 66th Foot and the 2nd Battalion of the 31st Foot. Hardinge directed two battalions each of the 6th and 18th Portuguese Infantry Regiments and the 6th Caçadores Battalion. Another source stated that in Pringle's brigade the 39th Foot was absent drawing new uniforms and that the 2nd Battalion of the 34th Foot and the 1st/28th Foot were the only units present.

Pringle's battalions quickly fought their way to the crest of the ridge. The French defenders gamely counterattacked but failed to drive away their enemies. As this combat was going on, Morillo's Spanish and Lecor's Portuguese began to envelop the flanks of the outnumbered French division. Seeing the threat, Harispe ordered a withdrawal. With the Portuguese closing in on the bridge, the French retreat soon became a stampede to safety. Most made it across the bridge but the Allies captured some men on the east bank. The French lost 300 men killed and wounded and 200 prisoners. The Allies suffered 170 casualties, including 40 Portuguese. In a melee with the 81st Line, the 1/39th lost 43 men. The rout so demoralized Harispe's division that their general was unable to rally his soldiers in Saint-Palais and had to retreat west to Domezain-Berraute. Though the French engineers managed to set off demolition charges on the bridge, the work was done poorly and the Allies soon had the bridge back in operation.

== Result ==
The Anglo-Allied army breached the line of the Bidouze. On 16 February, Soult recalled two of his divisions from north of the Adour leaving Abbé's division in Bayonne to make up a very powerful 14,000-man garrison. The French marshal assembled a field army with 32,000 infantry and 3,800 cavalry. He began reforming his line behind the Gave d'Oloron and Saison Rivers, from Peyrehorade through Sauveterre-de-Béarn and Navarrenx. Facing Soult were Wellington's 42,000 infantry and 3,000 cavalry. Beresford's corps moved to Bidache on the lower Bidouze. By 18 February, Soult's units were all on the Gave d'Oloron line as Hill probed at Sauveterre and Beresford reconnoitered Hastingues, a French bridgehead on the south bank. That night it began to snow and sleet, causing Wellington to suspend operations for four days.

Meanwhile, the British carried a bold plan to surround Bayonne by crossing the Adour below the fortress. Since the river is 300 yards (274 m) across with a tidal rise of 14 feet (4.3 m), the French never suspected their enemies would attempt it and left no forces to guard the Adour below Bayonne. On 23 February, Hope sent eight companies across to set up a bridgehead. That evening 700 French troops sent to investigate were dispersed by Congreve rockets. The next day, 34 coasting vessels sailed into the channel and a bridge was constructed using the vessels as pontoons. Five cables were secured to the opposite bank by attaching each of them to a heavy 18-pounder cannon barrel. When the vessels and cables were in place, a roadway was built of planks. British troops poured across the span and by 27 February the city of Bayonne was completely invested by Hope's corps. On that day Battle of Orthez was fought.

== Notes ==
Preceded by Battle of Vauchamps	Napoleonic Wars; Battle of Garris	Succeeded by Battle of Mormant
