= Aran (river) =

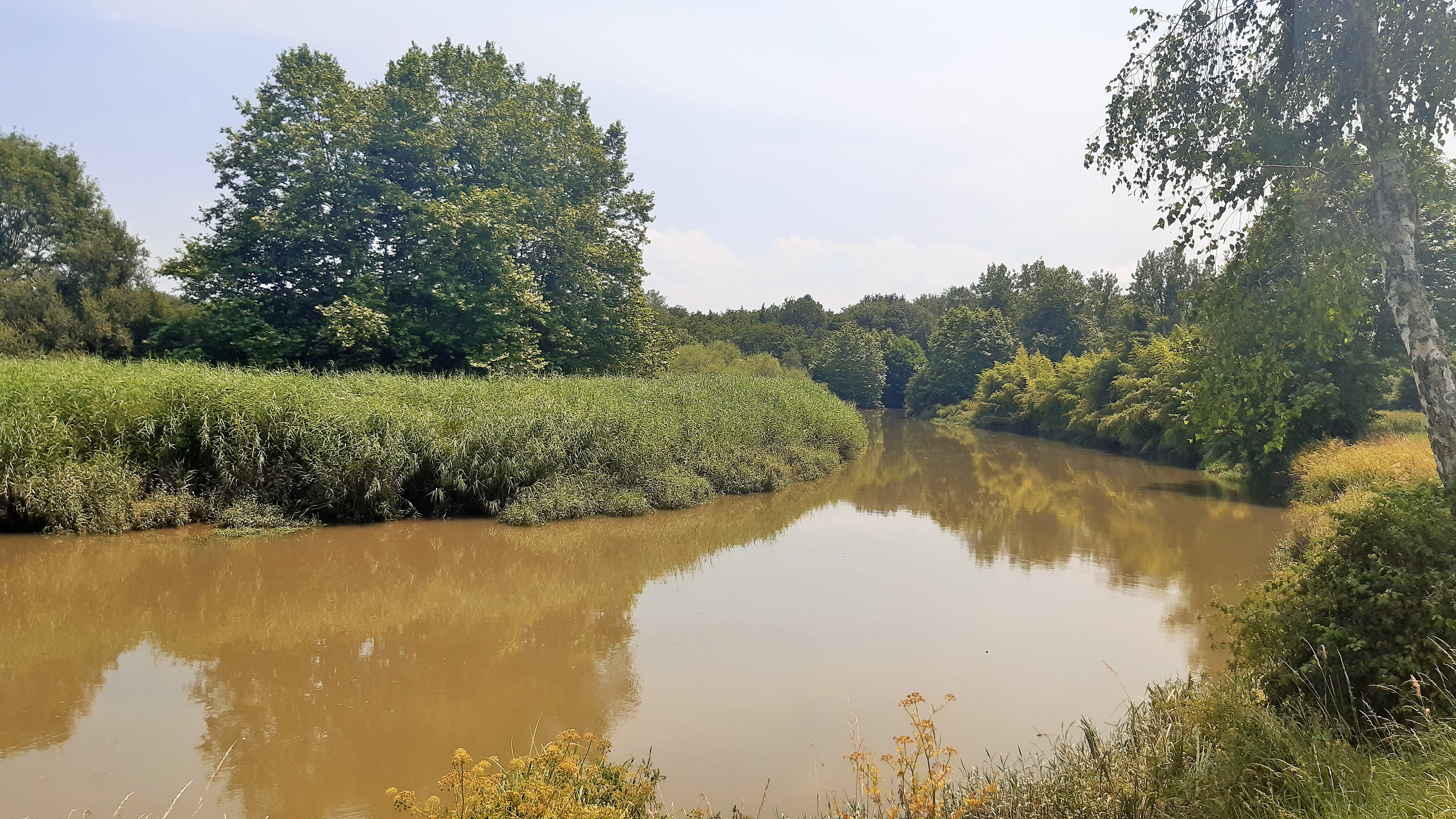
- The Aran in Bardos

- Location within France Location within Nouvelle-Aquitaine

Location
- Country: France

Physical characteristics
- Source
  - location: Mount Baigura
- Mouth
  - location: Adour
  - coordinates: 43°29′50″N 1°17′37″W
- Length: 48 km (30 mi)

Basin features
- Progression: Adour→ Atlantic Ocean

The Aran (French pronunciation: [aʁɑ̃]), from Basque Harana, is a left tributary of the Adour, in the French Basque Country, in Aquitaine, Southwest France. It is 48.4 km (30.1 mi) long.

The river is also known as the Joyeuse, which is also the name of a tributary of the Bidouze.

== Geography ==
The Aran rises on the northern side of the Baigura in Hélette. It flows between the Zihorri and Atezain, collects in Mendionde waters from Macaye, flows by the former castle of Garro, Bonloc, La Bastide-Clairence and the abbey of Belloc before joining the Adour at Port du Vern, below Urt. There, boats named Galupe, Gabarre and Couralin, were used for the carriage of stones or cattle, and today still, by fishermen.

The Aran shelters a rich ecosystem where can be found pikes, carps, zanders, eels, plaices, shads, lampreys, mullets and seabasses as well as, in season, salmons and elvers.

== Départements and towns ==
- Pyrénées-Atlantiques: Hélette, Mendionde, Bonloc, Ayherre, La Bastide-Clairence, Urt

== Main tributaries ==
- Aphara or Joyeuse from Ayherre
- Mendialtzu or Zuhi Handia, from the confluence of:
  - Marmareko erreka
  - Hazketa

== Name ==
The name Aran proceeds from the Basque word haran(a) which means "(the) valley".
