= Mount Baigura =

Mountain in France

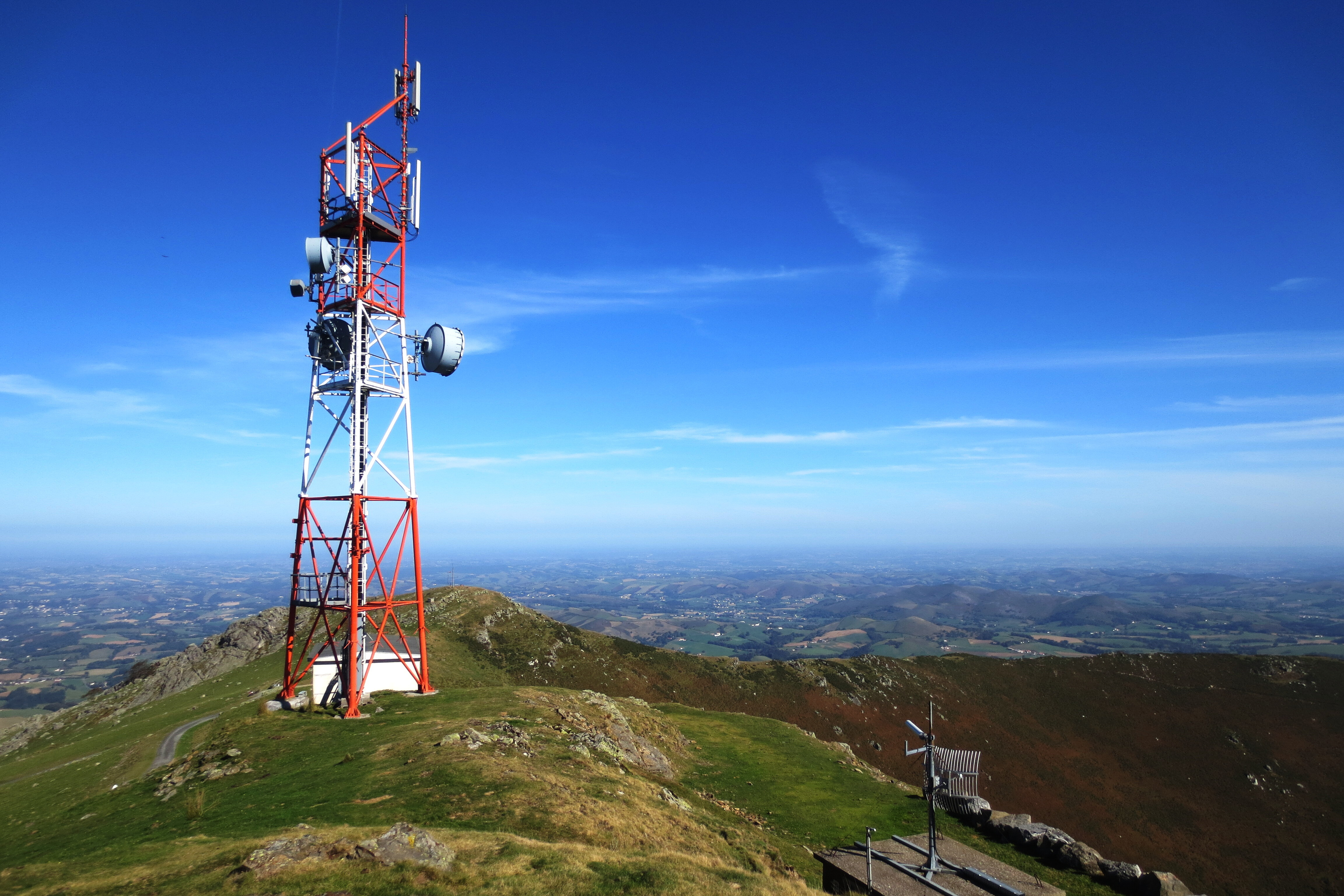
- From Mount Baigura, view to the northwest

Highest point
- Elevation: 897 m (2,943 ft)
- Prominence: 680 m (2,230 ft)
- Coordinates: 43°17′27″N 01°17′34″W

Geography
- Location within Pyrenees
- Location: Pyrénées-Atlantiques, France
- Parent range: Pyrenees

Climbing
- Easiest route: Hike

Mount Baigura (French pronunciation: [ba.iɡuʁa]), Baïgura, Baygoura or Baighoura (el. 897 m./2943 ft.) is a mountain of the inner French Basque Country. Transmitters are set up near its summit.

The leisure center ("base de loisir") at Baigura, on the road from Hélette to Louhossoa (in the commune of Mendionde), organizes paragliding activity on the northern slope of the mountain.

== Name ==
The name Baigura is related to modern Euskara (Basque) ibar 'valley', ibai 'river' and guren 'limit' and means 'the end of valley'.

== Geography ==
Mount Baigura is the highest point of a small isolated pre-pyrenean massif inside the French Basque Country in the southwest of Aquitaine, between the former provinces of Labourd and Lower Navarre.

The Haltzamendi (818 m) extends the massif toward the south.

== Climbing routes ==
The summit can be reached from Heraitze in Helette, passing by the St. Vincent chapel (Bixintxoko kapera), or from the leisure center.

The Haltzamendi can be reached from Bidarray.
