= Gure Sor Lekua =

1956 documentary film by General André Madré

Gure Sor Lekua is a documentary filmed in color in 1956 by General André Madré. It was the first feature film made in the Basque language, with the intention of fulfilling the nostalgia of the Basque diaspora. It premiered at the Haritz Barne cinema in Hasparren. On November 29, 2013, it was announced that a copy of this film, previously considered lost, had been recovered in Paris. Currently, no known audio of the film survives.

== History ==
According to the director, the film was aimed at the Basque diaspora. It premiered in 1956 in Hasparren, Madré's hometown. In 1956-1957, screenings were also held in Bayonne, Ustaritz, Ascain, Briscous, and Ayherre. At the director’s request, the proceeds were donated to the Basque House of Paris, where two screenings were also held. In 1961, a priest from Bayonne took a copy of the film to the United States. According to data collected by researcher Josu Martinez, screenings were also held in Dakar, and possibly Argentina. From 1958 to 1963, Madré organized annual Christmas film screenings both in the Northern and Southern Basque Country.

After Madré’s death in 1971, the film was considered lost, and it was rarely mentioned by historians until 2012. That year, Josu Martinez, a researcher at the UPV/EHU, while writing a thesis on the history of Basque cinema, discovered a copy of the film in Paris, at the home of André Madré’s widow, inside a cardboard box. The soundtrack has been lost, but articles from the 1950s and eyewitness accounts confirm that the film was recorded in Basque.

On December 20, 2013, a short version of the film was screened at the Zinegin Basque-language film festival in Hasparren, and on December 3, 2014, in Bilbao. It was also shown in Saint-Étienne-de-Baïgorry on October 4, 2015, with music by Joserra Senperena.

In 2014, Martinez defended his doctoral thesis titled Gure (zinemaren) Sor Lekua. Discovery, history, and analysis of the first Basque-language film. He also published the book Gure (zinemaren) sor lekua and directed the documentary Gure sor lekuaren bila, which recounts the story of the discovery and premiered on December 3, 2015.
