= Château de Belzunce =

Ruined castle in France

Coordinates: 43.3799°N 1.2336°W

The Château de Belzunce is a ruined castle in the commune of Ayherre in the Pyrénées-Atlantiques département of France. Its construction dates from the 13th, 14th and 16th centuries

== Description ==
The castle was built for Garcie Arnaud II.

The castle has a trapezoidal plan flanked by four towers, representing two periods of construction, the Middle Ages and the 16th century. During the 16th century, it was redeveloped and finally ruined. During the French Revolution, it was sold as national property. It appears to have been used as a stone quarry. Neighbouring buildings and the outer fortifications survive only as foundations. The castle is notable for the Belzunce family. (François de Belzunce was Bishop of Marseille at the beginning of the 18th century and the Marseille district of Belsunce was named by him.)

It is privately owned and has been registered since 1992 as a monument historique by the French Ministry of Culture. It is not possible to visit the site, but it may be clearly seen from the road.

== See also ==
- List of castles in France
