= Ayherre =

- Commune
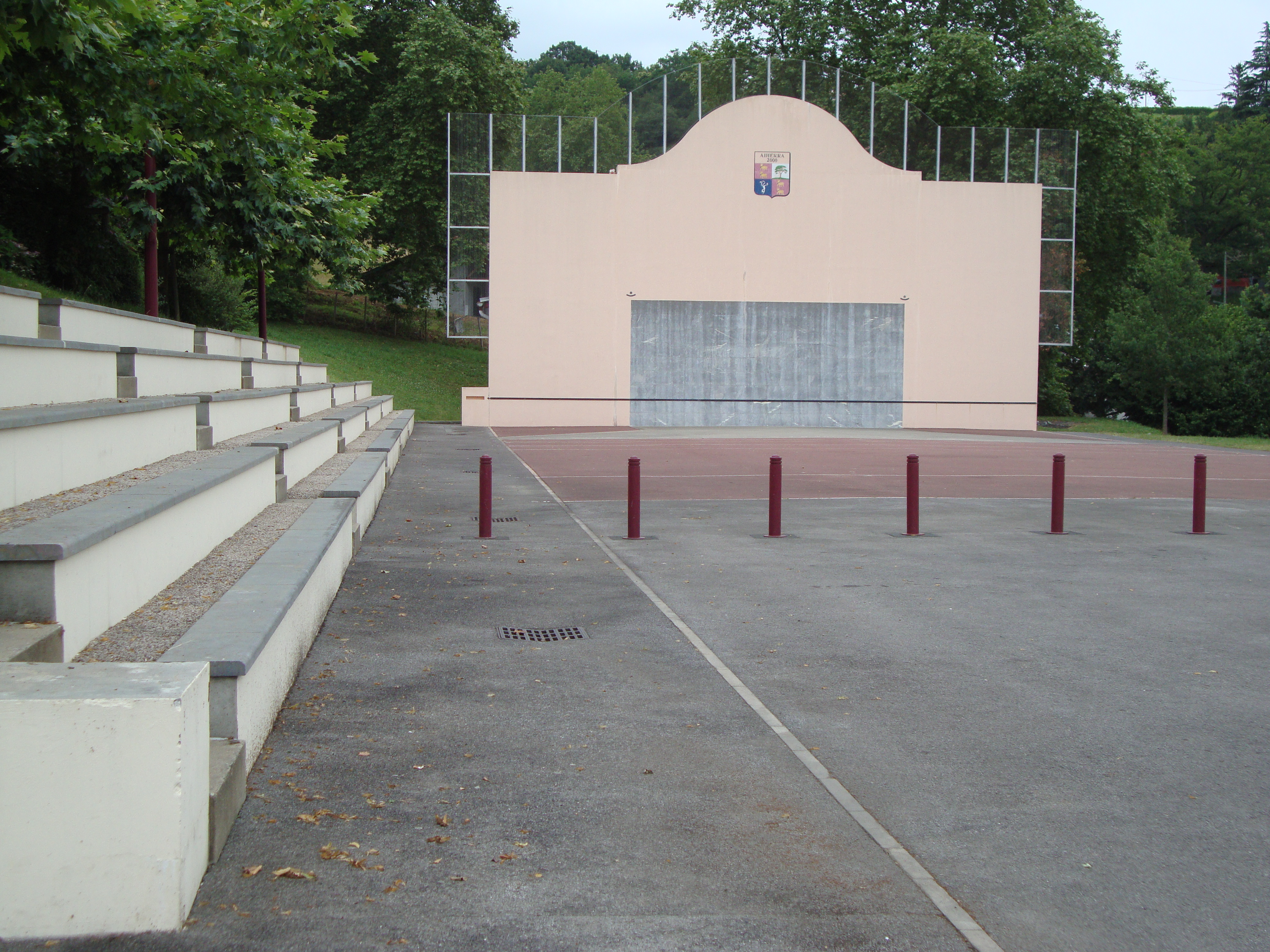
- The Pelota Court

- Coat of arms
- Location of Ayherre
- Location within France Location within Nouvelle-Aquitaine
- Coordinates: 43°23′35″N 1°15′11″W
- Country: France
- Region: Nouvelle-Aquitaine
- Department: Pyrénées-Atlantiques
- Arrondissement: Bayonne
- Canton: Pays de Bidache, Amikuze et Ostibarre
- Intercommunality: CA Pays Basque

Government
  - Mayor (2020–2026): Arnaud Gastambide
- Area^{1}: 27.65 km^{2} (10.68 sq mi)
- Elevation: 86 m (282 ft)
- Highest elevation: 465 m (1,526 ft)
- Lowest elevation: 20 m (66 ft)
- Population (2023): 1,128
  - Density: 40.80/km^{2} (105.7/sq mi)
- Time zone: UTC+01:00 (CET)
  - Summer (DST): UTC+02:00 (CEST)
- INSEE/Postal code: 64086 /64240
- ^{1} French Land Register data, which excludes lakes, ponds, glaciers > 1 km^{2} (0.386 sq mi or 247 acres) and river estuaries.

Ayherre (French pronunciation: [ajɛʁ]; Occitan: Alhors Basque: Aiherre) is a commune in the Pyrénées-Atlantiques department in the Nouvelle-Aquitaine region of south-western France.

== Geography ==
Ayherre is located in the Arberoue Valley in the former province of Lower Navarre some 23 km east by south-east of Bayonne and immediately east of Hasparren. Access to the commune is by the D10 road from Hasparren which passes through the west of the commune and continues north to La Bastide-Clairence. The D251 branches east off the D10 in the commune and goes to the village then continues east to Isturits. The D314 goes south-west from the village to Bonloc. The D14 from Bonloc to Saint-Esteben passes through the south of the commune. The commune is mainly farmland with scattered forests.

The commune is located in the drainage basin of the Adour with a dense network of streams covering the commune, mostly flowing north-westwards, and including the Joyeuse, which forms part of the western border of the commune. The Arbéroue rises in the south of the commune and flows north gathering many tributaries before joining the Lihoury to the north.

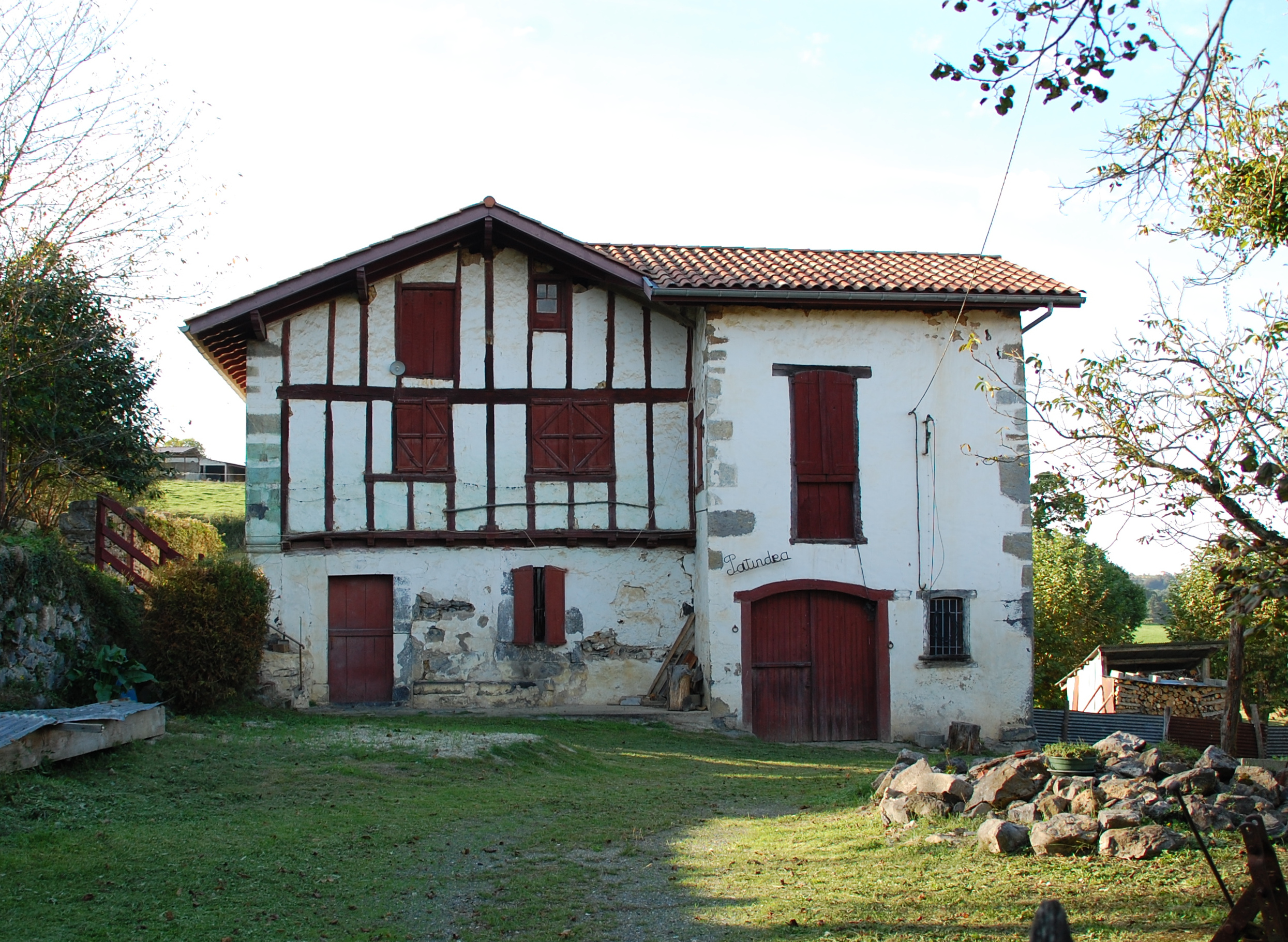
A Basque House

=== Places and hamlets ===
- Abarratia
- Ahounsbiscardeguy
- Aguerréa (3 places)
- Aguerréko Borda
- Ainguéroutéguia
- Andérétéguia
- Apairi or Apahiri, from Apʰara-hiri
- Apézénéa
- Apeztéguia
- Archidukénia
- Arduarria
- Arkhia
- Arramendy
- Arraydua
- Auchotéa
- Ayherregaraya
- Ballade Etcheberry
- Barné Uhartia
- Béhibidia
- Belzunce
- Berhéta
- Berhétako Borda
- Berhoa
- Bicaldéguy
- Bichartéa
- Bidartéa
- Bidegain Etchetoa
- Bidegainia
- Bildaraitz or Bildarraitz
- Bordalanda
- Buztingorria
- Celhaya
- Chapitalborda
- Chapitalia (mill)
- Chedarria
- Chelhaya
- Chocoa
- Courtaut
- Currioléko Borda
- Curutzaldéa
- Egyptoa
- Erketa
- Erregnétéa
- Errékahoua
- Errékartéa
- Espertatea
- Estekatea
- Etchartéa
- Etchébarnéko Borda
- Etchébazterréa
- Etchébéhéréa
- Etchébéhéreko Borda
- Etchéberria (2 places)
- Etcheberriko Borda
- Etchéberstia
- Etchéchouria
- Etchégaraya
- Etchégoïnéa
- Etchénika
- Etchenikako Borda
- Etchéparéa
- Etchétipia
- Etchetoa
- Eyhéra
- Ezpildéa
- Ferminéko Borda
- Fermirénéa
- Gandéramendia
- Gandéramendiko Borda
- Garralda
- Gauhetchia
- Granya
- Granyagaraya
- Haranbilléta
- Haranburua
- Haranéa
- Harréguia
- Harriéta
- Harriétako Borda
- Hastoya
- Hégoa
- Hergaitz
- Hiriartéa
- Ichuria
- Idiartéa
- Idigoïnia
- Ilharindéguia
- Ipoutsaguerria
- Irachiloa
- Irazabalia
- Iriart Urrutia
- Iribarnéa
- Iriberria
- Issouribeherea
- Jauberria (2 places)
- Jaungaztenia
- Jelossia
- Kintalénéa
- Kitendéa
- Larrégaïnia
- Larzabaléa
- Leichorrénéa
- Létouatéguia
- Lohichundéa
- Londaits
- Londaitsbehere
- Londaïtzberria
- Londaitzekoborda
- Lukua
- Lur Berry
- Manéchéka Borda
- Manéchénéa
- Mayartéguia
- Mendia
- Mendiberria
- Mendiburua
- Mendigorria
- Mendilarréa
- Menta
- Mentaberria
- Mentachiloa
- Mignotéguia
- Négutéa
- Notariaénia
- Ourriola
- Oyhana
- Oyharartéa
- Oyharitzéa
- Oyharitséko Borda
- Patindeya
- Peña
- Petchitea
- Pipitea
- Pompochénéa
- Sallaberryborda
- Sarcabaleko Borda
- Sarhigaïnéa
- Tuturrutéguia
- Uhaldéa
- Urgorria
- Urquéta
- Zabaloa
- Zabalza
- Zaliotéguia
- Zokoa

== Toponymy ==
The commune name in basque is Aiherra or Aiherre. According to Jean-Baptiste Orpustan, the name comes from the basque ailherr ("incline"), giving the meaning "place on a slope".

The following table details the origins of the commune name and other names in the commune.

Name	Spelling	Date	Source	Page	Origin	Description
Ayherre	Sancti petri de ilarre	1236	Orpustan			Village
	San Per de Aiherre	1321	Raymond	18	Camara	
	ayherra	1344	Orpustan			
	ayheRe	1350	Orpustan			
	Ajarra	1513	Raymond	18	Pamplona	
	Ahyerie	1754	Raymond	18	Collations	
	Aiherre	1750	Cassini			
L'Ahounbiscardéguy	L'Ahunbiscardéguy	1863	Raymond	3		Stream
Apairi	Apahiri	1863	Raymond	7		Hamlet
Aphara	Apara	1621	Raymond	7	Biscay	Farm
	Aphara	1863	Raymond	7		
***Bildarraitz	beldarais	1249	Orpustan			Hamlet
	bildarays	1350	Orpustan			
	bildarraiz	1413	Orpustan			
	Bildariz	1513	Raymond	31	Pamplona	
	Bildarraïts	1863	Raymond	31		
Belzunce	Belçunze	1384	Raymond	27	Duchesne	Chateau, fief of the Kingdom of Navarre
	Belzunce	1384	Raymond	27	Duchesne	
	Velçunce	1621	Raymond	27	Biscay	
	Balzunze	1621	Raymond	27	Biscay	
	Belsunce	1863	Raymond	27		
Berhoa	Le Berho	1863	Raymond	28		Stream
Chapitalborda	Chapitel	1621	Raymond	48	Biscay	Farm
	Chapital	1863	Raymond	48		
Erquéta	Erquéta	1863	Raymond	59		Hamlet
Etchebarnia	Echabarne	1435	Raymond	63	Pamplona	Farm
	Etchebarnia	1863	Raymond	63		
Etchebéhère	Echevehere	1435	Raymond	63	Pamplona	Farm
	Etchebéhère	1863	Raymond	63		
Hergaitz	la croix d'Ergaïts	1863	Raymond	59		Place of Pilgrimage
Londaïtz	Londayz	1621	Raymond	103	Biscay	Farm
	Londaïts	1863	Raymond	103		
Lukua	Le Lucu	1863	Raymond	106		Stream
Mendigorria	Mendigorria	1621	Raymond	111	Biscay	Farm
	Mendigorry	1863	Raymond	111		
La Place	La Place	1863	Raymond	135		Hamlet
L'Uhartea	L'Uhartea	1863	Raymond	170		Stream

    - In the Middle Ages Bildarraitz was an independent area without a church but with its own council, and a half-dozen homes were ennobled in 1435. The name may be the joining of bil-, meaning "set" or "a round place", and araitz, meaning "blackthorn", "prickly", or "briar".

Sources:

- Orpustan: Jean-Baptiste Orpustan, New Basque Toponymy
- Raymond: Topographic Dictionary of the Department of Basses-Pyrenees, 1863, on the page numbers indicated in the table. (in French)
- Cassini: Cassini Map from 1750

Origins:

- Camara: Titles of Camara of Comptos
- Pamplona: Titles of Pamplona)
- Collations: Collations of the Diocese of Bayonne
- Biscay: Martin Biscay
- Duchesne: Duchesne collection volume CXIV

== History ==
On 18 March 1450, Labourd returned to the French crown after the signing of a peace treaty at the Château of Belzunce in Ayherre which marked the end of English influence in the region. On that the representatives of Labourd made their submission and, upon payment of 2,000 gold écus secured by the retention of 10 hostages, retained their privileges.

=== Heraldry ===
Arms of Ayherre	Adopted in 2001 based on the arms of the lords of Belzunce Blazon: Quarterly, 1 and 4 Gules, 2 cows of Or horned and belled Azure posed in fesse; 2 Argent, an oak eradicated proper; 3 Azure a hydra Argent with 3 heads.

== Administration ==
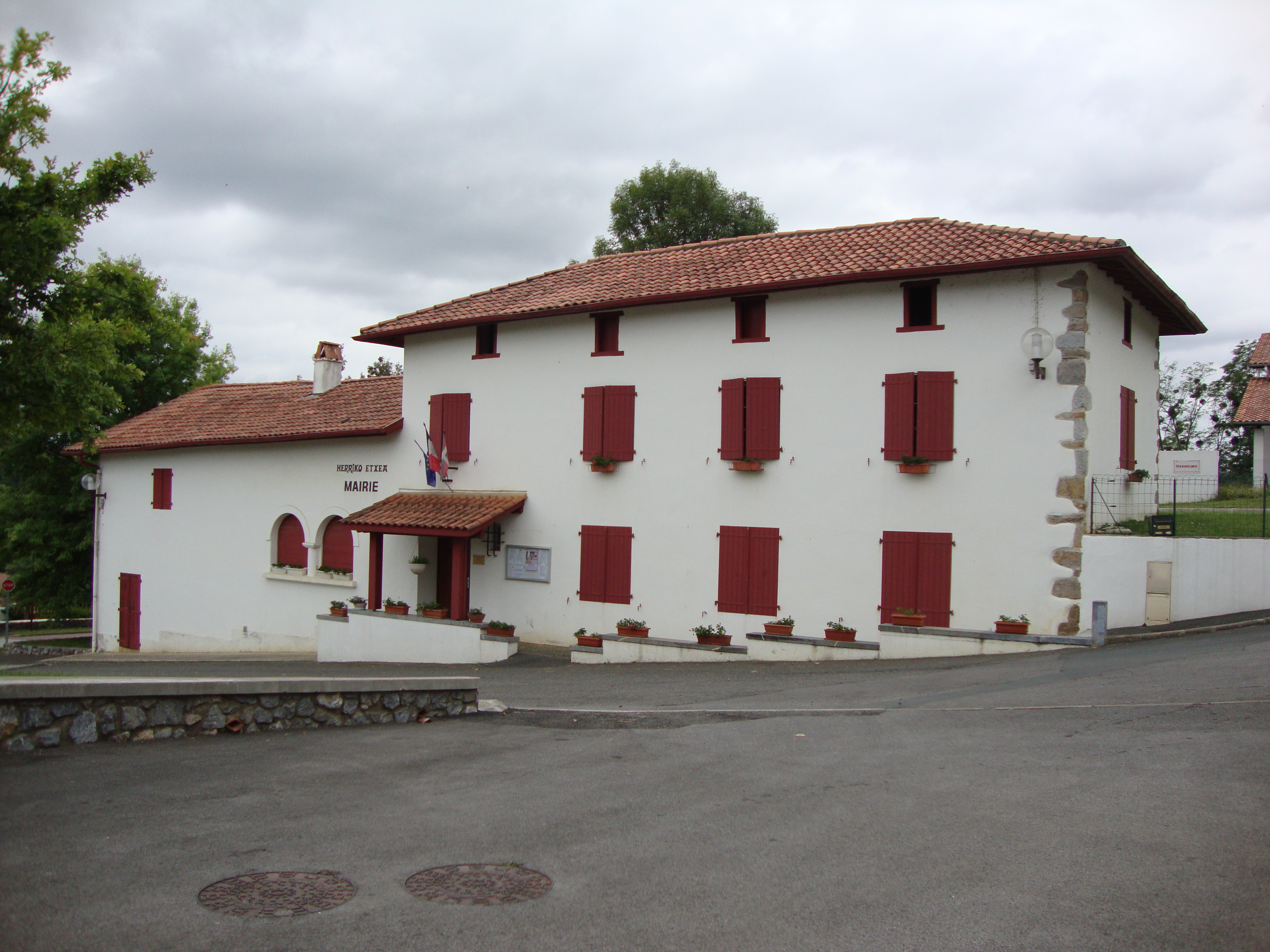
The Town Hall

List of successive mayors

From	To	Name
1995	2014	Jean Paul Basterretche
2014	2026	Arnaud Gastambide

=== Inter-communality ===
The commune is part of six inter-communal structures:

- the Communauté d'agglomération du Pays Basque
- the AEP association of Arberoue
- the sanitation association of Adour-Ursula
- the energy association of Pyrénées-Atlantiques
- the inter-communal association for the building of a retirement home in the Arberoue Valley
- the inter-communal association for the crafts zone in Ayherre

== Demography ==
The declaration of rights in 1749 counted 162 fires in Ayherre (130 third estate, one priest, two members of the nobility (Arcangues and Belsunce) and 29 non-owners).

The inhabitants of the commune are known as Aihertars.

Historical population

Year	Pop.	±% p.a.
1793	1,410	—
1800	1,502	+0.91%
1806	1,500	−0.02%
1821	1,454	−0.21%
1831	1,513	+0.40%
1836	1,522	+0.12%
1841	1,607	+1.09%
1846	1,731	+1.50%
1851	1,671	−0.70%
1856	1,619	−0.63%
1861	1,507	−1.42%
1866	1,505	−0.03%
1872	1,508	+0.03%
1876	1,490	−0.30%
1881	1,392	−1.35%
1886	1,244	−2.22%
1891	1,157	−1.44%
1896	1,153	−0.07%
1901	1,193	+0.68%

Year	Pop.	±% p.a.
1906	1,161	−0.54%
1911	1,127	−0.59%
1921	1,028	−0.92%
1926	951	−1.55%
1931	952	+0.02%
1936	1,027	+1.53%
1946	969	−0.58%
1954	854	−1.57%
1962	842	−0.18%
1968	810	−0.64%
1975	765	−0.81%
1982	812	+0.86%
1990	791	−0.33%
1999	841	+0.68%
2007	956	+1.61%
2012	992	+0.74%
2017	1,042	+0.99%
2023	1,128	+1.33%

Source: EHESS and INSEE

== Economy ==
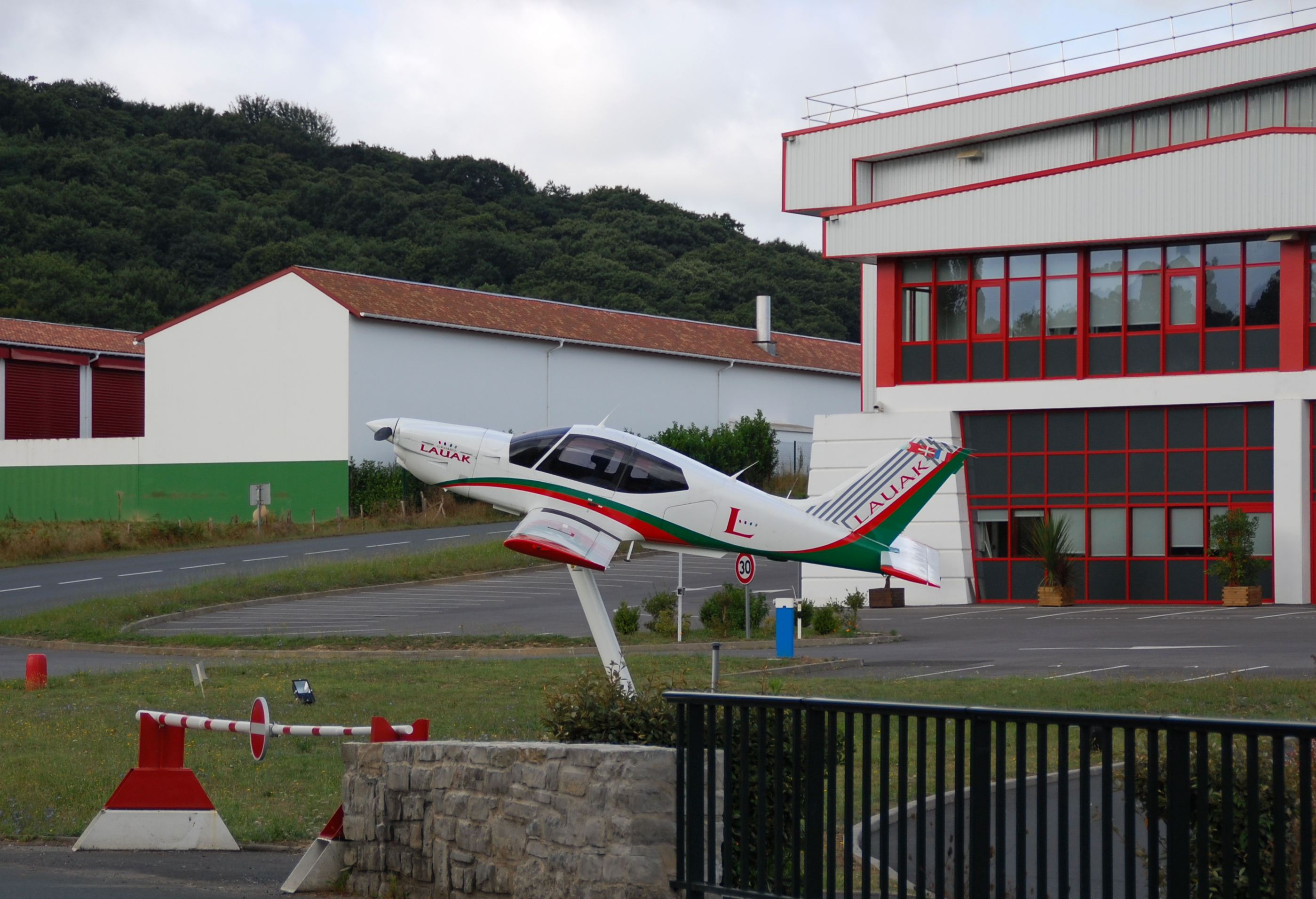
The Lauak factory

Economic activity in the commune is mainly agricultural. The commune is part of the Appellation d'origine contrôlée (AOC) zone of Ossau-iraty.

The Lauak company (aeronautical and aerospace industry) is located in the industrial zone of Ayherre.

The Uhagun Mill on the Aran dates to the 19th century and has been converted into a hydro-electric plant.

== Culture and heritage ==
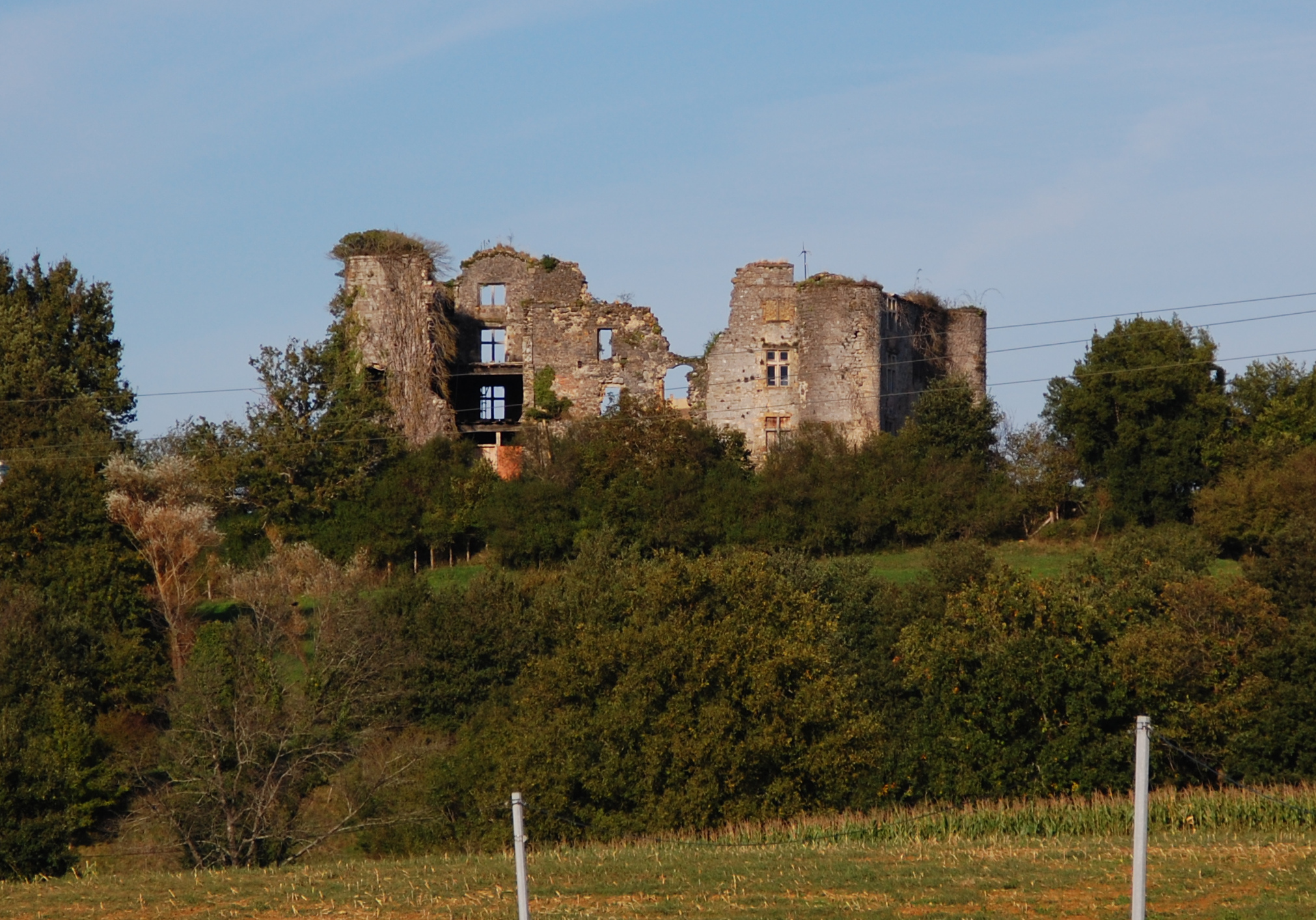
Chateau of Belzunce

=== Civil heritage ===
The commune has three sites that are registered as historical monuments:

- The Château de Belzunce (13th century)
- Prehistoric fortifications on Mount Abarratia
- Prehistoric fortifications (Gaztelu Zahar of three levels)

=== Religious heritage ===
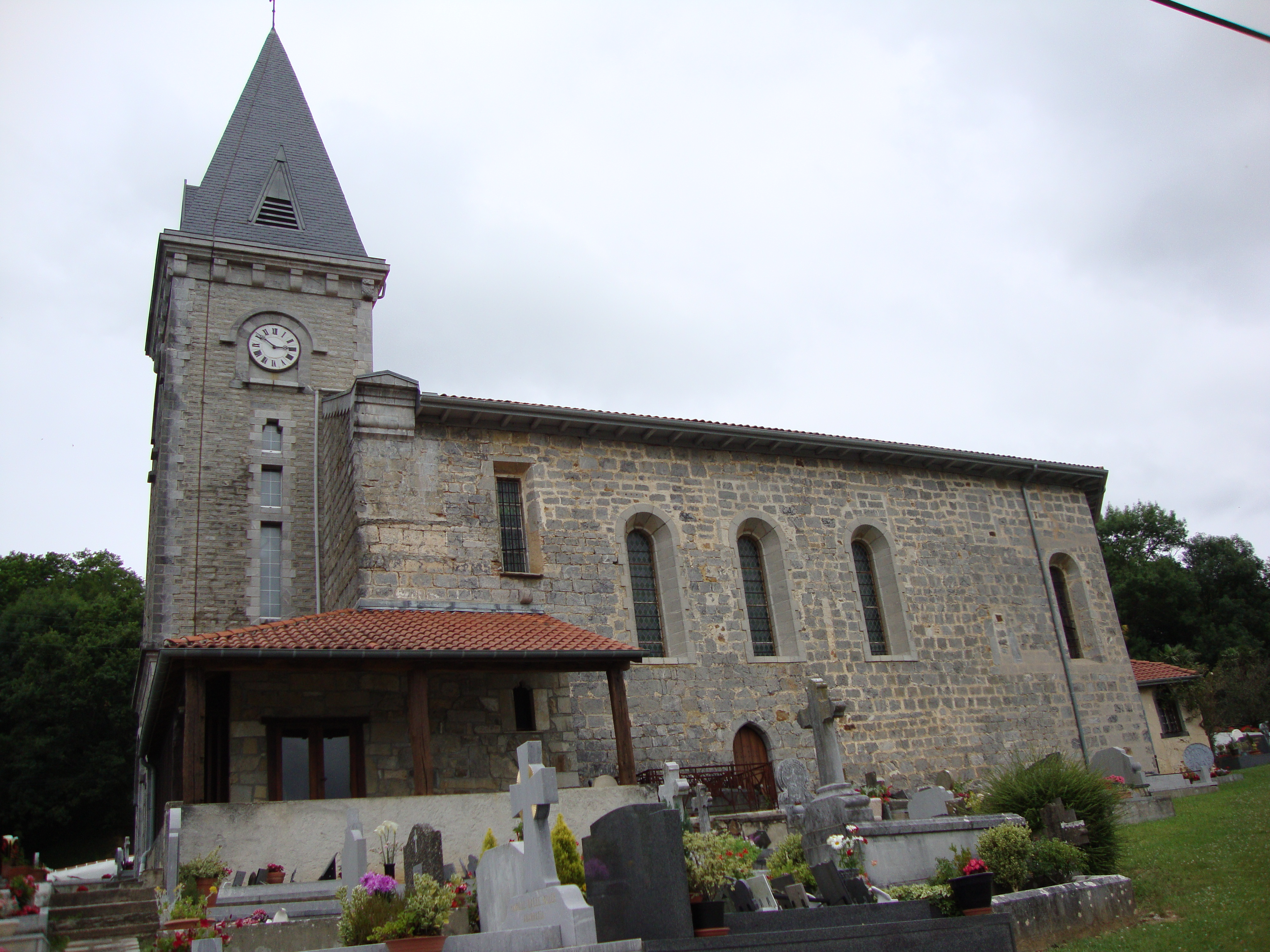
The Parish Church of Saint Pierre

The Parish Church of Saint Pierre (17th century) is registered as an historical monument.

== Education ==
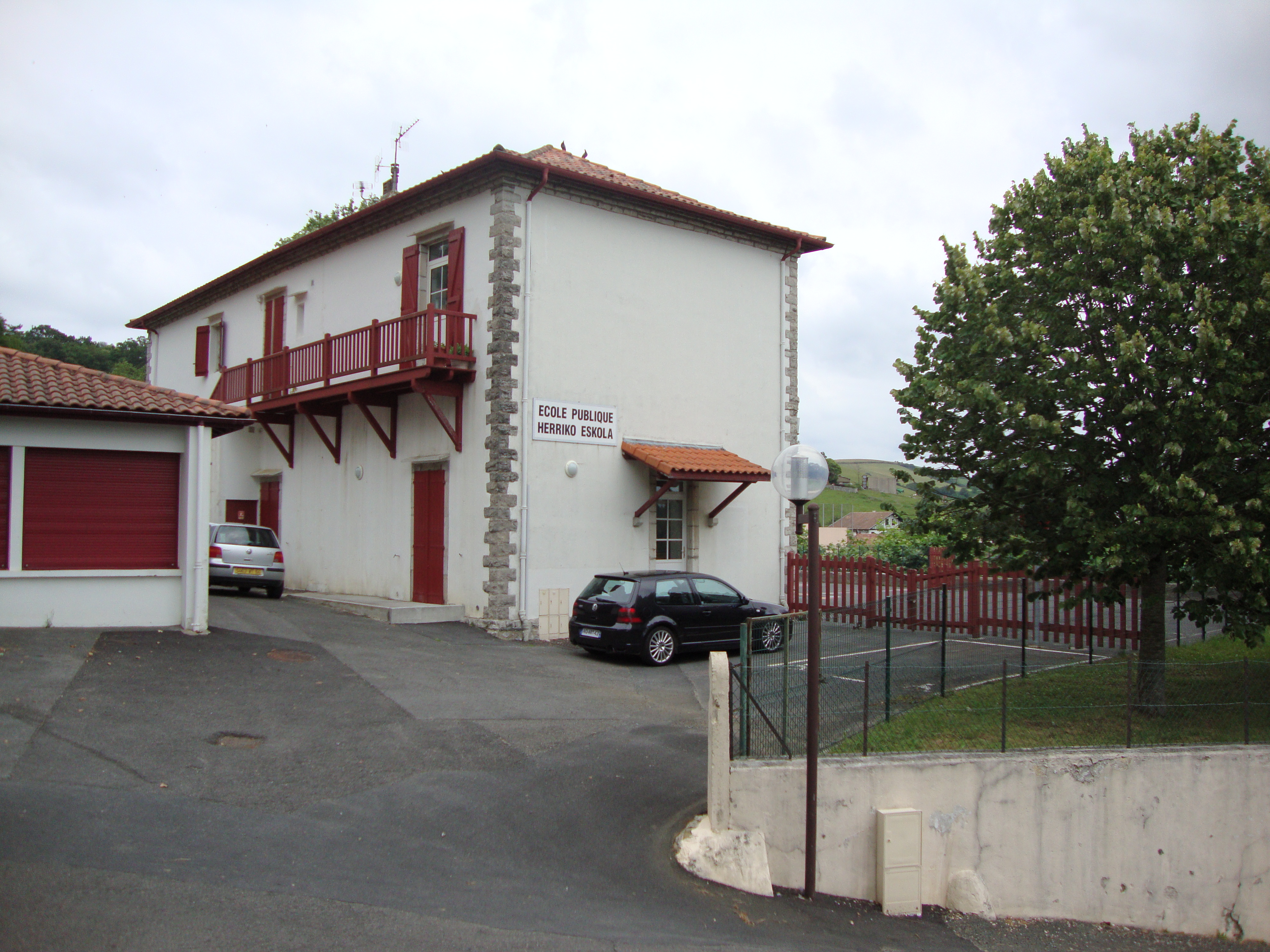
The school

The commune has two primary schools: one in the town and one private school of the Immaculate Conception.

== Notable people linked to the commune ==
- Émile Larre, born in 1926 at Saint-Étienne-de-Baïgorry, was a priest, chronicler, Bertsolari, writer, and French academic in the Basque language. He was an active promoter of basque traditions and particularly attached to the basque modes of expression such as the bertsolarism and Basque Pelota. He was priest of Ayherre from 1969 to 1980.

== See also ==
- Communes of the Pyrénées-Atlantiques department
