= Pierre Benoît Soult =

French army officer

- Coat of arms of Pierre Benoît Soult
- Born: 19 July 1770; Saint-Amans-La-Bastide, France
- Died: 7 May 1843 (aged 72) Tarbes, July Monarchy
- Allegiance: Kingdom of France; Kingdom of the French; First French Republic; First French Empire; Bourbon Restoration; July Monarchy
- Branch: Cavalry
- Service years: 1788–1815
- Rank: General of Division
- Conflicts: French Revolutionary Wars; Napoleonic Wars
- Awards: Légion d'Honneur

Pierre Benoît Soult (French pronunciation: [pjɛʁ bənwa su]; 19 July 1770 – 7 May 1843) joined the French royal army before the French Revolution. He fought in the French Revolutionary Wars, emerging from the conflict as colonel of a cavalry regiment. A good deal of his early career was spent as aide-de-camp to his brother Jean-de-Dieu Soult who became Marshal in 1804. Transferred to Spain during the Napoleonic Wars, he first led a corps cavalry brigade, then after 1813 he commanded a cavalry division. During the Peninsular War he took part in the 1814 Battle of Orthez where he commanded 2,700 cavalry and watched the river line upstream (east) from the town of Orthez. He also saw action during the Hundred Days after Napoleon returned from exile in Elba. After 1830, he was brought out of retirement when his brother became part of the government. SOULT, P. is one of the names inscribed under the Arc de Triomphe.

== Early career ==
His brother, Jean-de-Dieu Soult, was chief of staff to François Joseph Lefebvre, but on 11 October 1794 he was promoted general of brigade and assigned to lead a brigade in André Poncet's division. When the Army of Sambre and Meuse crossed the Lahn River on 20–21 September 1795, Jean-de-Dieu Soult's brigade led Poncet's division. Pierre Soult, who served as his brother's aide-de-camp, led a group of soldiers across the river and held a small bridgehead until the rest of the brigade arrived. However, the ford was so narrow that some soldiers drowned. Soult saw that the cavalry was missing the ford, so he dashed back to the bank, just as General of Brigade Louis Klein fell off his horse and began to sink. Soult swam out and saved Klein's life, earning him a letter of thanks from the French government.
