= Mendionde =

Mendionde Lekorne
- Commune
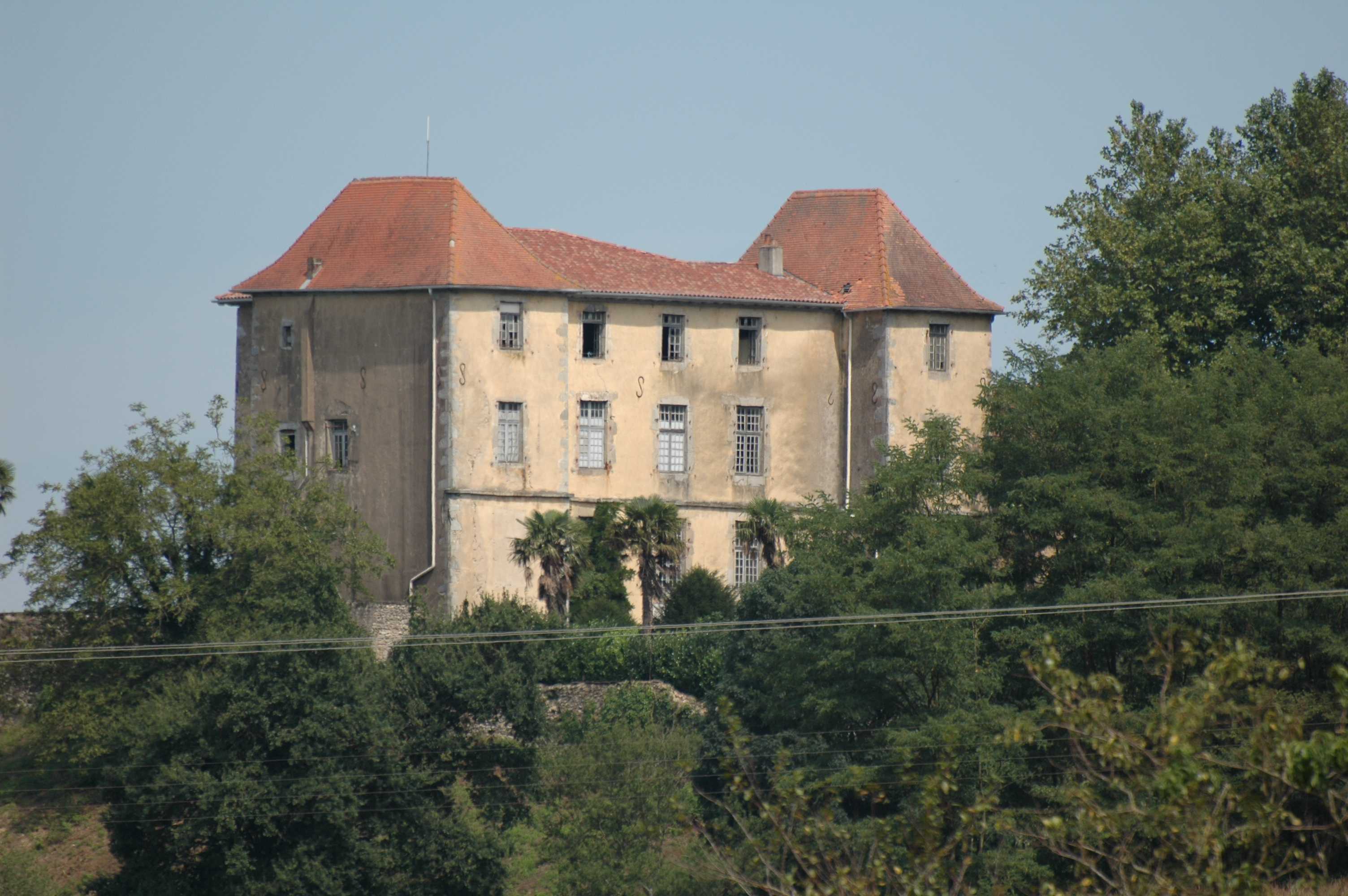
- The Chateau of Garro in Mendionde
- Location of Mendionde
- Location within France Location within Nouvelle-Aquitaine
- Coordinates: 43°20′28″N 1°17′50″W
- Country: France
- Region: Nouvelle-Aquitaine
- Department: Pyrénées-Atlantiques
- Arrondissement: Bayonne
- Canton: Pays de Bidache, Amikuze et Ostibarre
- Intercommunality: CA Pays Basque

Government
  - Mayor (2020–2026): Hervé Damestoy
- Area^{1}: 21.47 km^{2} (8.29 sq mi)
- Elevation: 140 m (460 ft)
- Highest elevation: 846 m (2,776 ft)
- Lowest elevation: 58 m (190 ft)
- Population (2023): 854
  - Density: 39.8/km^{2} (103/sq mi)
- Time zone: UTC+01:00 (CET)
  - Summer (DST): UTC+02:00 (CEST)
- INSEE/Postal code: 64377 /64240
- ^{1} French Land Register data, which excludes lakes, ponds, glaciers > 1 km^{2} (0.386 sq mi or 247 acres) and river estuaries.

Mendionde (French pronunciation: [mɛ̃djɔ̃d]; Occitan: Mendiant; Basque: Lekorne) is a small village and a commune in the Pyrénées-Atlantiques department in south-western France. It is part of the traditional Basque province of Labourd.

== See also ==
- Communes of the Pyrénées-Atlantiques department
