= Port-de-Lanne =

- Commune
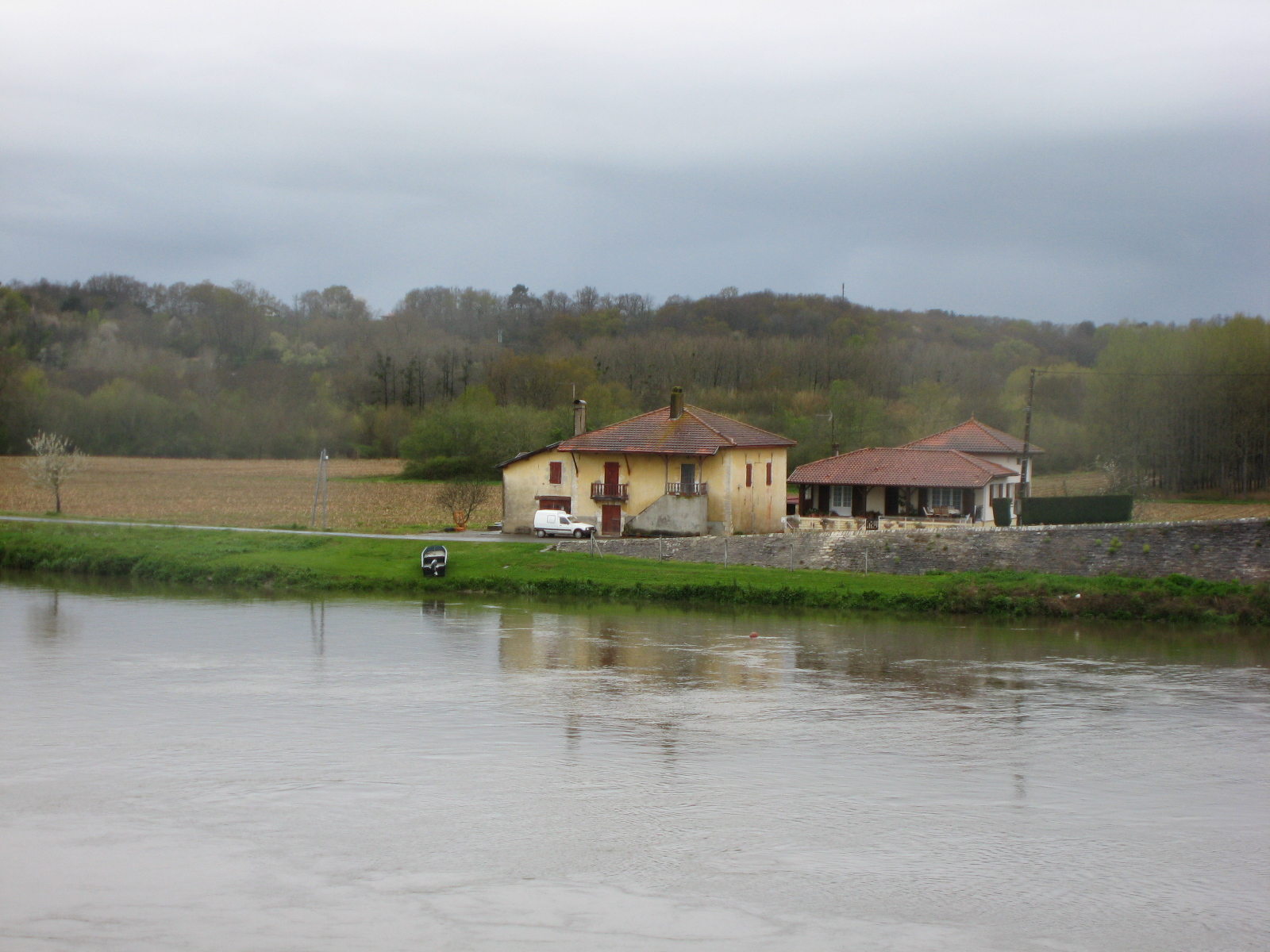
- The Adour in Port-de-Lanne
- Location of Port-de-Lanne
- Location within France Location within Nouvelle-Aquitaine
- Coordinates: 43°33′57″N 1°10′39″W
- Country: France
- Region: Nouvelle-Aquitaine
- Department: Landes
- Arrondissement: Dax
- Canton: Orthe et Arrigans
- Intercommunality: Pays d'Orthe et Arrigans

Government
  - Mayor (2020–2026): Valérie Brethous
- Area^{1}: 12.68 km^{2} (4.90 sq mi)
- Elevation: 25 m (82 ft)
- Highest elevation: 63 m (207 ft)
- Lowest elevation: 0 m (0 ft)
- Population (2023): 1,232
  - Density: 97.16/km^{2} (251.6/sq mi)
- Time zone: UTC+01:00 (CET)
  - Summer (DST): UTC+02:00 (CEST)
- INSEE/Postal code: 40231 /40300
- ^{1} French Land Register data, which excludes lakes, ponds, glaciers > 1 km^{2} (0.386 sq mi or 247 acres) and river estuaries.

Port-de-Lanne (French pronunciation: [pɔʁ də lan]; Occitan: Lanas) is a commune in the Landes department in Nouvelle-Aquitaine in southwestern France.

== Population ==
Historical population
Year	Pop.	±% p.a.
1968	605	—
1975	602	−0.07%
1982	637	+0.81%
1990	665	+0.54%
1999	700	+0.57%
2007	859	+2.59%
2012	928	+1.56%
2017	1,076	+3.00%
2023	1,232	+2.28%
Source: INSEE

== See also ==
- Communes of the Landes department
