= Bonloc =

Bonloc Lekuine
- Commune
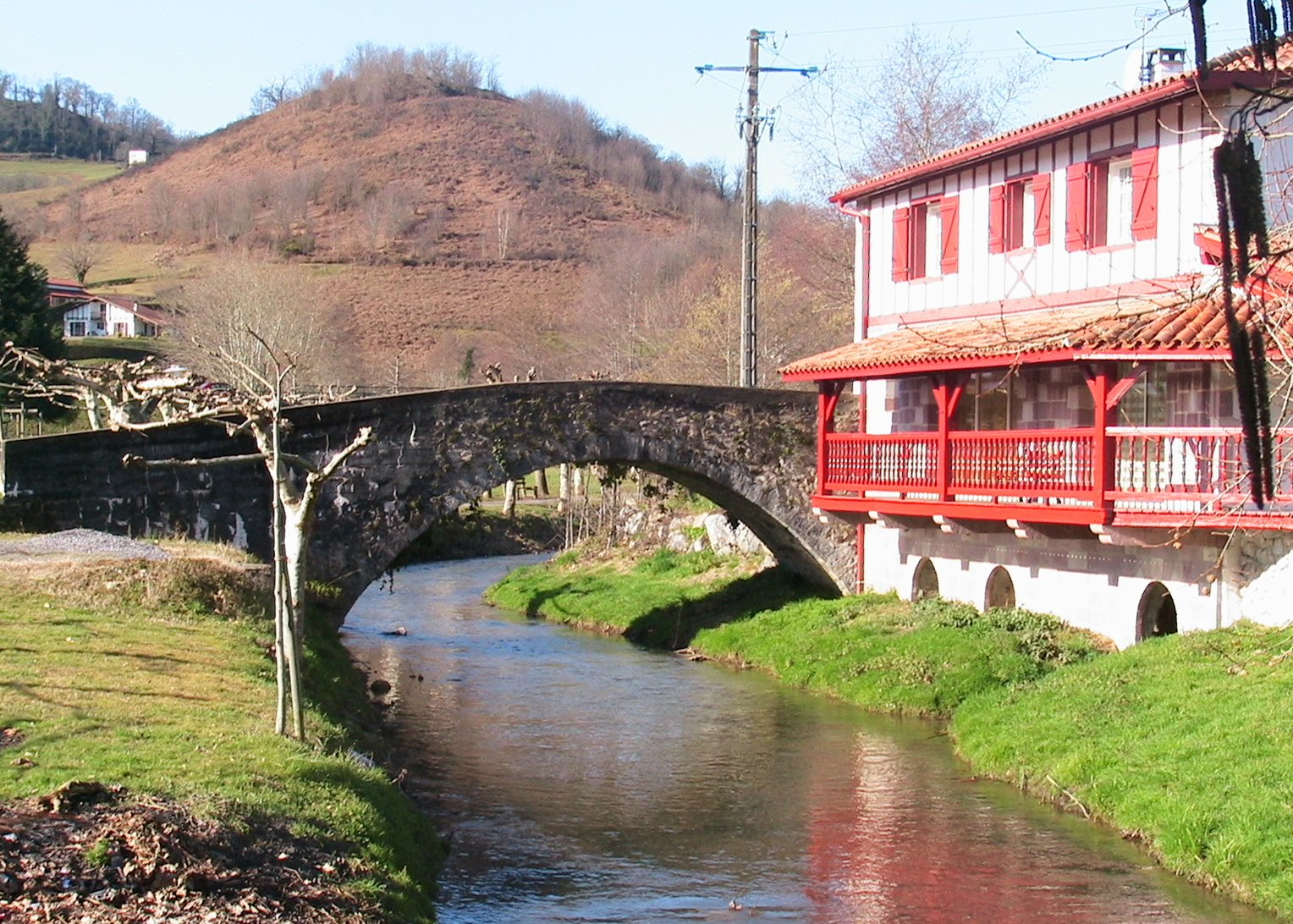
- The bridge of Bonloc/Lekuine, over the Aran river

- Coat of arms
- Location of Bonloc
- Location within France Location within Nouvelle-Aquitaine
- Coordinates: 43°22′09″N 1°15′55″W
- Country: France
- Region: Nouvelle-Aquitaine
- Department: Pyrénées-Atlantiques
- Arrondissement: Bayonne
- Canton: Pays de Bidache, Amikuze et Ostibarre
- Intercommunality: CA Pays Basque

Government
  - Mayor (2020–2026): Michel Etcheverry
- Area^{1}: 1.02 km^{2} (0.39 sq mi)
- Elevation: 123 m (404 ft)
- Highest elevation: 146 m (479 ft)
- Lowest elevation: 51 m (167 ft)
- Population (2023): 376
  - Density: 369/km^{2} (955/sq mi)
- Time zone: UTC+01:00 (CET)
  - Summer (DST): UTC+02:00 (CEST)
- INSEE/Postal code: 64134 /64240
- ^{1} French Land Register data, which excludes lakes, ponds, glaciers > 1 km^{2} (0.386 sq mi or 247 acres) and river estuaries.

Bonloc (French pronunciation: [bɔ̃lɔk]; Basque: Lekuine) is a commune in the Pyrénées-Atlantiques department in southwestern France.

A resident of Bonloc is known as a Lekuindar in Basque.

== See also ==
- Communes of the Pyrénées-Atlantiques department
