= Hélette =

Hélette Heleta
- Commune
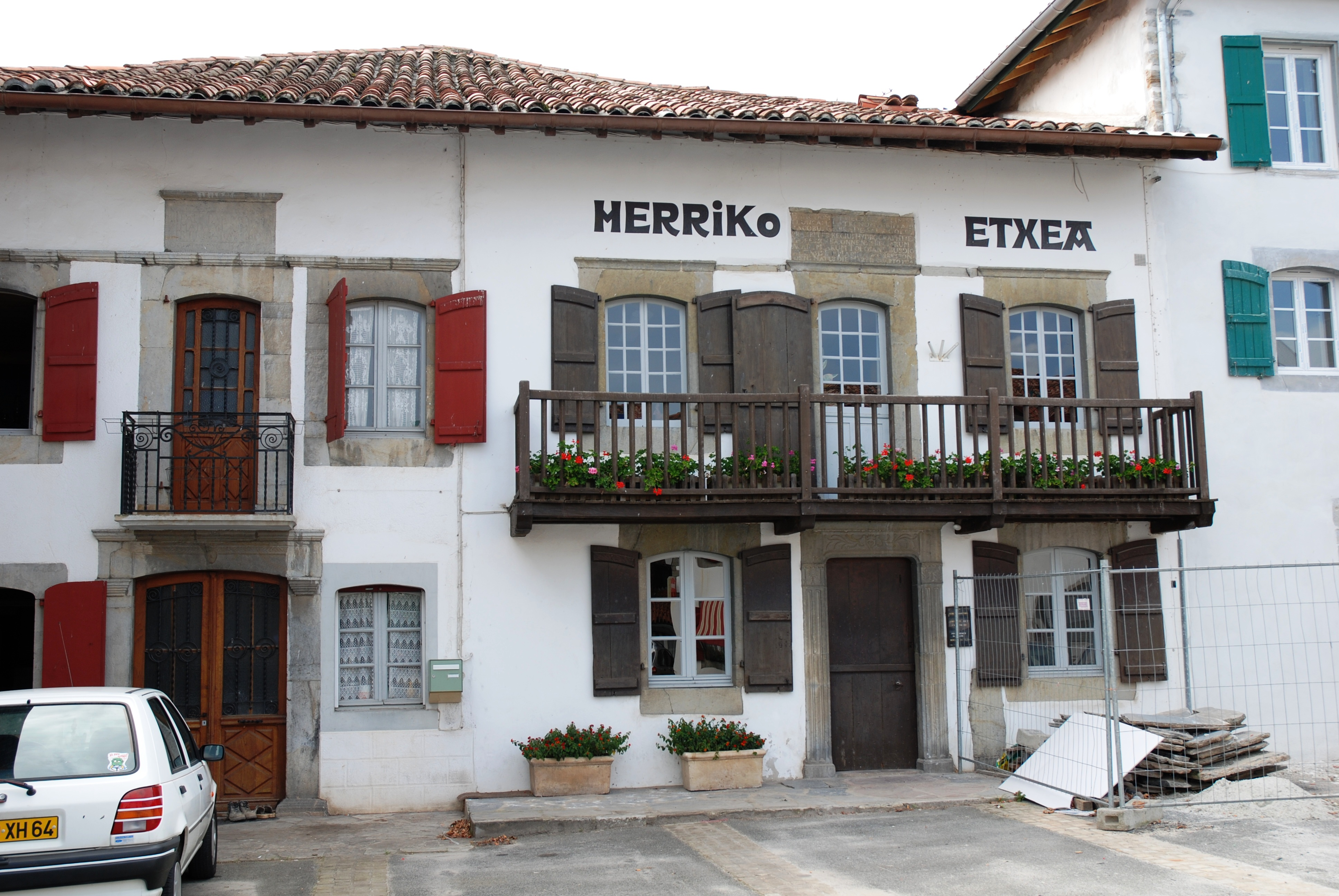
- The town hall of Hélette
- Location of Hélette
- Location within France Location within Nouvelle-Aquitaine
- Coordinates: 43°18′33″N 1°14′35″W
- Country: France
- Region: Nouvelle-Aquitaine
- Department: Pyrénées-Atlantiques
- Arrondissement: Bayonne
- Canton: Pays de Bidache, Amikuze et Ostibarre
- Intercommunality: CA Pays Basque

Government
  - Mayor (2020–2026): Philippe Etchepare
- Area^{1}: 23.45 km^{2} (9.05 sq mi)
- Elevation: 278 m (912 ft)
- Highest elevation: 842 m (2,762 ft)
- Lowest elevation: 177 m (581 ft)
- Population (2023): 758
  - Density: 32.3/km^{2} (83.7/sq mi)
- Time zone: UTC+01:00 (CET)
  - Summer (DST): UTC+02:00 (CEST)
- INSEE/Postal code: 64259 /64640
- ^{1} French Land Register data, which excludes lakes, ponds, glaciers > 1 km^{2} (0.386 sq mi or 247 acres) and river estuaries.

Hélette (French pronunciation: [elɛt]; Occitan: Alèta; Basque: Heleta) is a commune in the Pyrénées-Atlantiques department in south-western France.

It is located in the former province of Lower Navarre.

== See also ==
- Communes of the Pyrénées-Atlantiques department
