= General Rey =

General Rey may refer to:

- Gabriel Venance Rey (1763–1836), French Army general
- Jean-Pierre-Antoine Rey (1767–1842), French Army brigadier general
- Louis Emmanuel Rey (1768–1846), French Army general
- General Philip Rey, fictional general in G.I. Joe media

== See also ==
- General Ray (disambiguation)
- General Rea (disambiguation)
