= Antoine Morlot =

French division commander

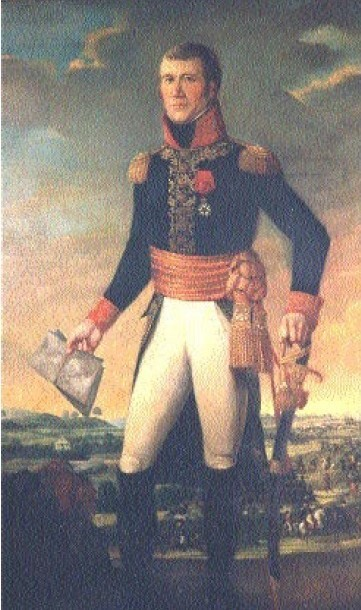
- Born: 5 May 1766; Bousse, France
- Died: 23 March 1809 (aged 42) Bayonne, France
- Allegiance: France
- Branch: Infantry
- Service years: 1782–1809
- Rank: General of Division
- Conflicts: War of the First Coalition; Blockade of Thionville; Battle of Kaiserslautern; Battle of Arlon; Battle of Lambusart; Battle of Fleurus; Battle of Aldenhoven; Peninsular War; Battle of Tudela; Siege of Zaragoza
- Awards: Légion d'Honneur, CC, 1804

Antoine Morlot (English: /mɔːrˈloʊ/ mor-LOH, French: [ɑ̃twan mɔʁlo]; 5 May 1766 – 23 March 1809) was a French division commander during the French Revolutionary Wars and Napoleonic Wars. After almost eight years of service in the French Royal Army, he became an officer in a local volunteer battalion during the French Revolution. In 1792 he fought with distinction at Thionville and other actions, earning a promotion to general officer in 1793. He was notable for his participation at the Battle of Kaiserslautern where he led a brigade. After another promotion he became a general of division in the Army of the Moselle. In 1794 he led his troops at Arlon, Lambusart, Fleurus and Aldenhoven.

In 1796, while Morlot's soldiers were garrisoning Aachen and its district, he was involved in a dispute with a government official and suspended from command. Restored to service, he thereafter held posts in the interior or was inactive for many years. In 1808 when Emperor Napoleon invaded Spain in the Peninsular War, Morlot was given a division of recruits. He led these soldiers at the Battle of Tudela that year and the Second Siege of Zaragoza in 1809, dying of a fever contracted during the siege. His surname is one of the names inscribed under the Arc de Triomphe. He is buried at the cimetière du Père-Lachaise.

== Revolution ==
=== Through 1793 ===
Morlot was born on 5 May 1766 at Bousse in what is now the Moselle department. On 7 December 1782 he joined the artillery of the French Royal Army, serving until 28 September 1790. At the outbreak of the French Revolution, he was elected captain in the 3rd Battalion of the Moselle Volunteers. He showed bravery and ability in the campaigns of 1792 and 1793, particularly during the blockade of Thionville. At Thionville from 3 to 5 September 1792, 3,000 to 4,000 French soldiers successfully held the city against an army of 20,000 the Habsburgs and Émigrés. Without heavy artillery, the attackers were forced to turn back. To put the French effort in context, on 2 December Verdun had surrendered to a Prussian army after a trifling resistance.

Morlot received promotion to general of brigade on 20 September 1793. The Battle of Kaiserslautern from 28 to 30 November 1793 saw him leading a brigade in Lazare Hoche's Army of the Moselle. The brigade was made up of the 1st Battalions of the 44th and 81st Line Infantry Demi Brigades and the Ardennes Volunteers, the 2nd Battalions of the 71st Line and Haute-Marne Volunteers and the 6th Battalion of the Meurthe Volunteers. Ultimately, the French withdrew with 2,400 killed and wounded plus 700 men and two guns captured. Prussian and Saxon casualties numbered 806. During the battle Morlot led five battalions in an assault on a position defended by infantry and many cannons. Forced back by superior numbers, he was able to avoid being trapped by enemy cavalry and resume his unit's place in the battle line. After seeing what he had done Hoche praised and kissed him.

Morlot was active in the relief of Landau which successfully resisted a blockade from 20 August until 23 December 1793. Morlot was promoted to general of division on 3 December 1793. At this time, Hoche's Army of the Moselle and the Army of the Rhine under Jean-Charles Pichegru made a concerted effort to push the invading Prussian and Habsburg armies out of Alsace. In the Second Battle of Wissembourg in December the French armies were victorious.

=== 1794 ===
In February 1794, Morlot was one of seven division commanders in the Army of the Moselle. His division consisted of the 1st Battalions of the 1st Line Infantry Demi Brigade and Haut-Rhine Volunteers, the 2nd Battalions of the 17th and 43rd Line, the 3rd Battalions of the Bas-Rhin, Loiret, Meuse and Puy-de-Dôme Volunteers, the 4th Battalions of the Côte-d'Or and Moselle, the 6th and 7th Battalions of the Meurthe and the 1st and 14th Dragoon Regiments. On 20 May his 11,573-strong division operated with the Left Wing of the Army of the Moselle. It had been reorganized into the 1st Line Infantry Demi Brigade, 34th Line, 110th Line, 177th Line, 14th Dragoons, 10th Cavalry Regiment and 1st Gendsdarmes. By 3 June, Morlot's division had been reduced but still counted 8,210 soldiers. The division included the 1st Line (2,190), 34th Line (2,354), 110th Line (2,709), 14th Dragoons (445), 10th Cavalry Regiment (416) and 30th Light Artillery Company (96).

In April 1794, Morlot distinguished himself at the Battle of Arlon. On 24 May he led his troops across the Meuse River near Dinant and on 16 June his division crossed the Sambre River near Charleroi. On the 16th he was forced to abandon the village of Gosselies but managed to bring off seven captured cannons. On this day in the Battle of Lambusart, 41,000 Austro-Dutch repelled the attack by Jean Baptiste Jourdan's 73,000-man army with 3,000 casualties and the loss of eight guns and 40 munitions wagons. The Austro-Dutch army also suffered 3,000 killed and wounded.

Morlot's division fought at the Battle of Fleurus on 26 June 1794. Jean Baptiste Olivier's brigade was made up of the 110th Line and 14th Dragoons while Henri Simon's brigade included the 1st and 34th Line and 10th Cavalry. During the battle, Morlot's troops resisted the attacks of Peter Vitus von Quosdanovich's column. When Jean Etienne Championnet's neighboring division faltered, Morlot personally led a bayonet charge that saved the situation. He was also responsible for the observation balloon and may have gone aloft during the day to make reports. During the battle, Jourdan's 81,000 French troops defeated the 46,000-man Austro-Dutch army under Prince Josias of Coburg. Each side suffered about 5,000 casualties. Fleurus marked a "turning point" and the Allies abandoned Belgium within a month. Morlot performed notably at the Battle of Aldenhoven on 2 October 1794 and at the Siege of Maastricht.

=== 1795–1801 ===
On 1 October 1795 Morlot commanded a 3,471-strong division of the Army of Sambre-et-Meuse at Aachen. While engaged as governor of Aachen and the lands between the Meuse and Rhine Rivers, he came into conflict with the director general of the military police. The outraged official accused Morlot of extortion and he was relieved of command on 26 October 1796. Reinstated on 25 December 1796, Morlot was assigned to lead the 10th Military Division on 28 August 1797 and the 3rd Military Division on 29 January 1798. In the next two years he transferred between service in the Batavian Republic, Army of the West and Grisons. On 23 September 1801 he was placed on inactive duty.

== Empire ==
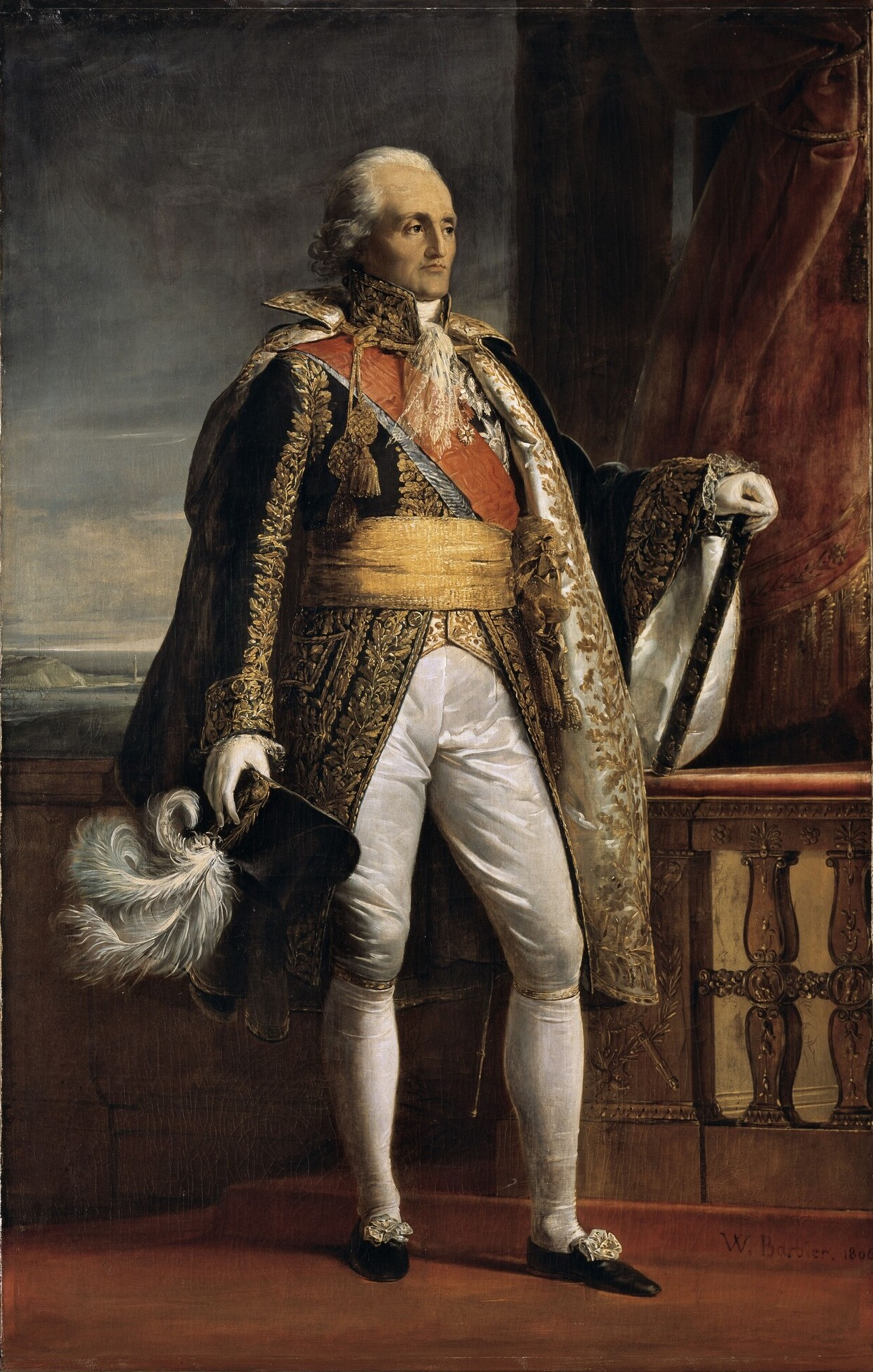
Bon-Adrien de Moncey

On 14 June 1804, Morlot was made a commander of the Légion d'Honneur. On 19 November 1805 he was employed as commander of the 16th Military Division and on 9 November 1807 he was assigned to the Corps of Observation of the Ocean Coast. In 1808 the 29,341-strong corps was under the command of Marshal Bon-Adrien Jeannot de Moncey. Morlot commanded the 7,149-man 3rd Division which consisted of the 9th, 10th and 11th Provisional Regiments and a Prussian battalion. His brigadiers were Charles Joseph Buget (Bujet) and Simon Lefebvre. Morlot's soldiers were from the conscript classes of 1808 and 1809 which had been called up a year early. The provisional regiments were each made up of four 560-man battalions from the regimental depots in southern France. The soldiers were all untrained draftees and the officers were all half-pay men or brand-new sous lieutenants. These were the troops who invaded Spain in 1808.

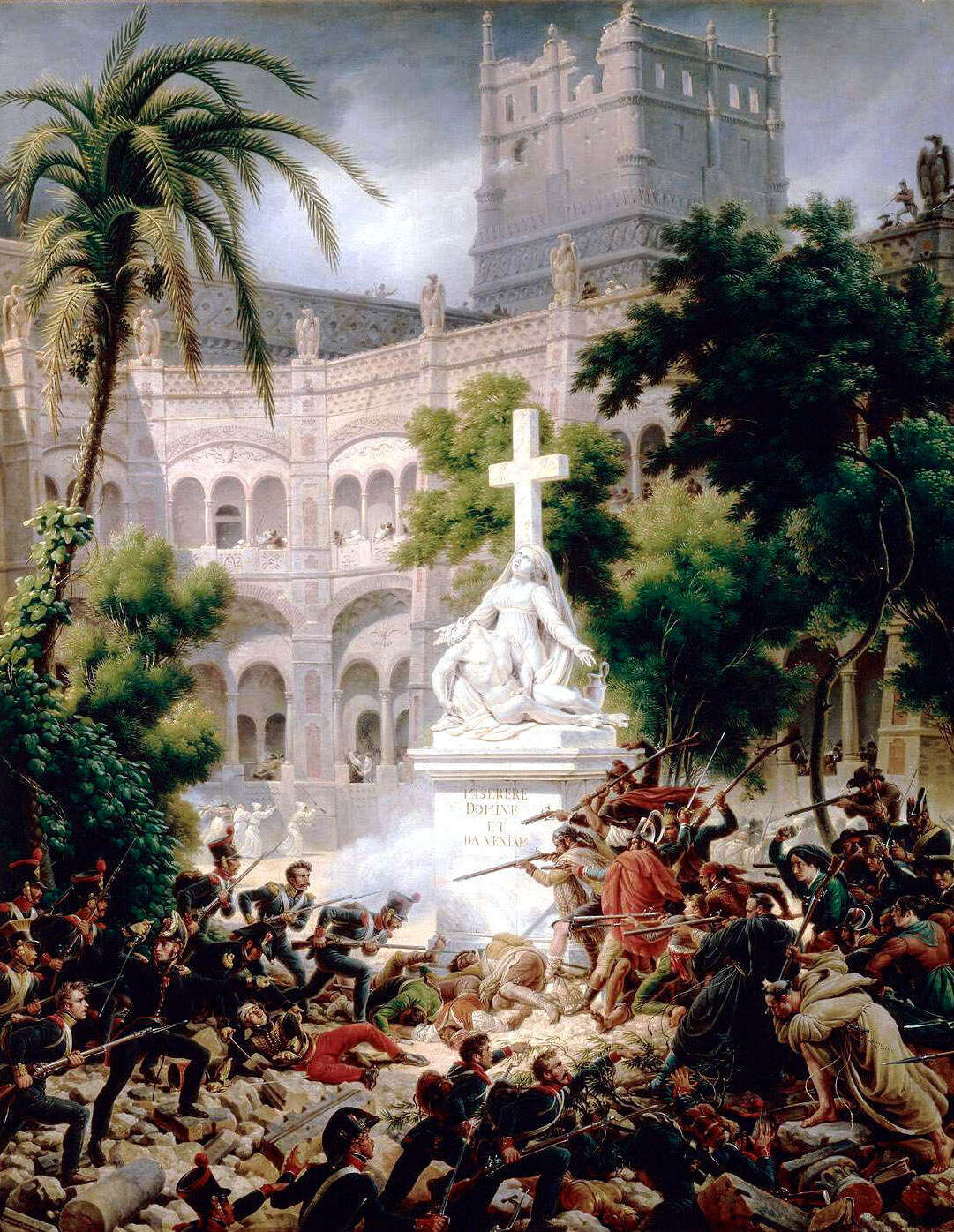
The Siege of Zaragoza involved bitter and bloody street fighting.

Morlot missed Moncey's expedition that ended unsuccessfully in the Battle of Valencia. Instead, his division guarded Madrid. When the news of the disastrous Battle of Bailén arrived, Morlot's division was separated. Buget's 3,700-man brigade remained near Madid while Lefebvre's brigade had been lent to Marshal Jean Baptiste Bessieres' corps. Madrid was quickly abandoned and the French retreated beyond the Ebro River. Before subsequent operations, the 3rd Division was reorganized as part of the III Corps. The 5th Provisional Regiment became the 2-battalion 116th Line Infantry Regiment while the 9th and 10th Provisional were combined to form the 4-battalion 117th Line. The division's Irish and Prussian battalions were detached as garrisons in northeast Spain.

Morlot led about 4,000 men in six battalions at the Battle of Tudela on 23 November 1808. That morning Marshal Jean Lannes had his troops on the road at dawn. Reaching Tudela at 9 AM the French caught the Spanish army unprepared. Seeing the half-unmanned defenses, Lannes sent his leading division under Morlot directly into the assault. The 6,500 soldiers of the Spanish 5th Division arrived just in time to blunt the attack on the Cerro de Santa Barbara. Before resuming the attack, Lannes waited a few hours for all his troops to reach the battlefield. Then he launched the divisions of Morlot and Maurice Mathieu at the Spanish positions. Morlot's front line brigade suffered heavy losses, but he sent one battalion up a ravine that the defenders neglected to watch. Noting that the battalion had gained a foothold on the crest, he pushed forward reinforcements and soon the Spaniards were fleeing in rout.

In November 1808, the 1st, 3rd and 4th Divisions of the III Corps and Marshal Michel Ney's VI Corps reached Zaragoza. Soon Ney was ordered away, leaving Moncey with only 15,000 men to face 30,000 Spaniards. Accordingly, Moncey pulled back to a safe distance until the V Corps arrived to help. In December 1808, Morlot's division received two additions. The 4-battalion 121st Line arrived at the front and was assigned to the division. Three battalions of the 5th Light Infantry and four battalions of the 2nd Légion of the Reserve were added when the 4th Division of the corps was dissolved. During this period, the III Corps suffered terribly from illness. In October, there were 7,741 men in the hospital and by January 1809 there were 13,000 wounded or fever-ridden soldiers.

The Second Siege of Zaragoza lasted from 20 December 1808 to 20 February 1809. On the second day, the divisions of Morlot and Charles Louis Dieudonne Grandjean successfully captured Monte Terrero. On 29 December Moncey was replaced in command of the III Corps by Jean-Andoche Junot. After the withdrawal of one V Corps division on 2 January, Morlot's division was assigned to attack the west front of the city. Lannes assumed overall command of operations on 22 January. By the 28th the French had captured a large section of the city wall and the rest of the siege involved bitter street fighting. To minimize casualties, Lannes reduced the Spanish defenses block by block with cannonballs and mines. On 12 February a crowd of women emerged from the city and approached Morlot's lines. They begged to be allowed to return to their villages. They were each given a loaf of bread and chased back into the city. By the end of the siege, casualties were horrific. About 54,000 Spaniards died in the siege of whom 20,000 were soldiers. Of these, only 6,000 died in the fighting while the others succumbed from disease, many from typhus. French losses are estimated as 10,000 dead of whom 4,000 perished in the battle and the remainder from illness. The great majority of the losses were suffered by the III Corps.

Morlot was another victim of the fever. He was evacuated to Bayonne where he died on 23 March 1809. MORLOT is one of the names inscribed under the Arc de Triomphe, on Column 6. He is buried at the cimetière du Père-Lachaise in Paris.
