= 57th Infantry Regiment (France) =

French Army regiment

- 57e régiment d'infanterie
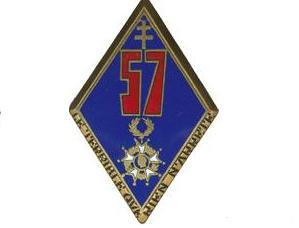
- Unit insignia
- Active: 1667 - 2011
- Country: Kingdom of France (1667-1792); First French Republic (1792-1815); Bourbon Restoration (1815-1848); France (1848-2011)
- Type: Line Infantry/Infantry
- Nickname: "Les Terribles"
- Engagements: French Revolutionary wars Napoleonic Wars; World War I World War II

Commanders
- Notable commanders: (First French Empire) Jean-Pierre-Antoine Rey

The 57th Infantry Regiment or (57e Régiment d'Infanterie de Ligne) was a regiment of the French Army, and heir of the Beauvaisis Regiment after having been named Sainte-Maure in 1677, before becoming part of the Beauvaisis region in 1685.

== History ==
The Regiment was in almost continuous existence since its establishment under the Kingdom of France, the French First Republic, the First French Empire and during the course of both World Wars.

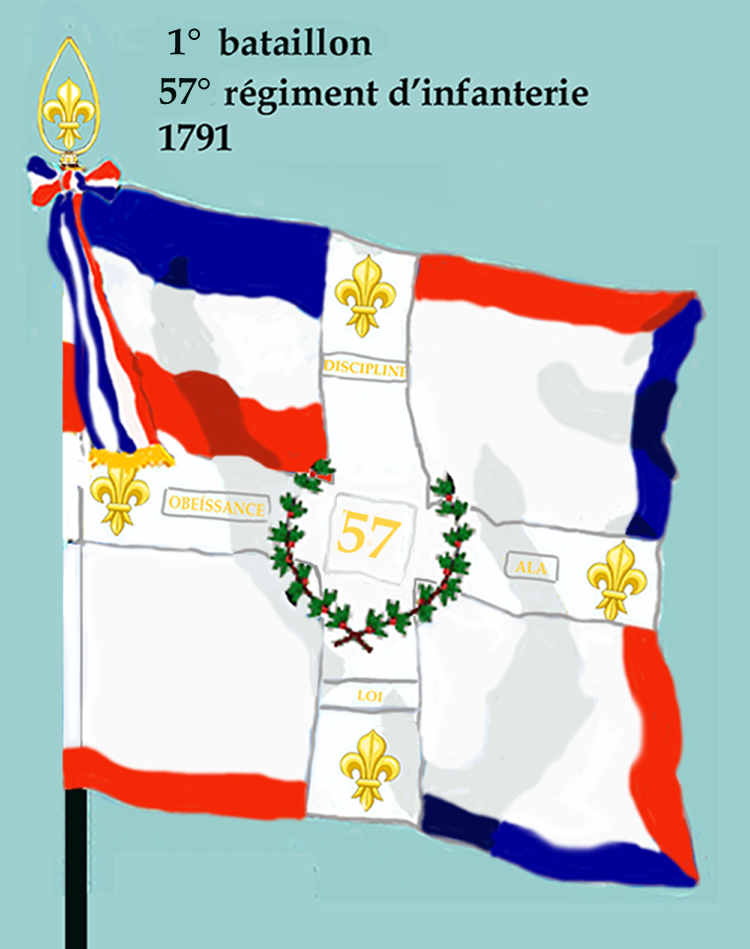
57e régiment d'infanterie colour 1791.

=== 1667-1792 ===
The regiment came from a tradition carried since 1667 after being named Régiment de Sainte-Maure. It later became part of Beauvaisis region, and renamed Régiment de Beauvoisis in 1685, prior to the revolution. In 1791 the regiment was renumbered and renamed to 57e Régiment d'Infanterie de Ligne. The word regiment was abolished for a few years, and replaced by "Demi-Brigades", before being restored again by Napoleon.

=== 1792-1814 ===
Colour of 57e régiment d'infanterie, showing battles they participated.

In the Napoleonic Wars, during the War of the First Coalition the regiment participated in the Italian campaigns. They participated in the Battle of Arcole, the Battle of Rivoli, and the Siege of Mantua (1796–1797).

This regiment also participated in almost all of Napoleon's Campaigns, and the Coalition Wars, especially in the Battle of Austerlitz. During Austerlitz, they were assigned to Marshal Nicolas Soult's IV Corps, in Colonel Jean-Pierre-Antoine Rey's Brigade with the 10e règiment d'infanterie de Léger. During the battle, Napoleon gave Soult order to charge the Pratzen Heights. Marshal Soult then gave the order to Vandamme's Division that included Rey's brigade to storm the Pratzen Heights, where they engaged Russian infantry from Dmitry Dokhturov's columns.

During the French Invasion of Russia, the regiment was reassigned again to Louis-Nicolas Davout's I Corps. The 57th Infantry Regiment achieved its nickname "Les Terribles" in the Grande Armée after the Battle of Borodino when they captured a Bagration flèches stronghold during Davout's Corps' attack against Bagration's army's position around 6 A.M. Some believe that Pyotr Bagration, after seeing the 57e's bravery, and his captured flèches, he was impressed by the regiment's bravery, and shouted, "Bravo, Bravo!" Not long after, he was fatally wounded by a French shell struck him in the leg. Napoleon also quoted during the battle, "The Terrible 57th which nothing can stop".

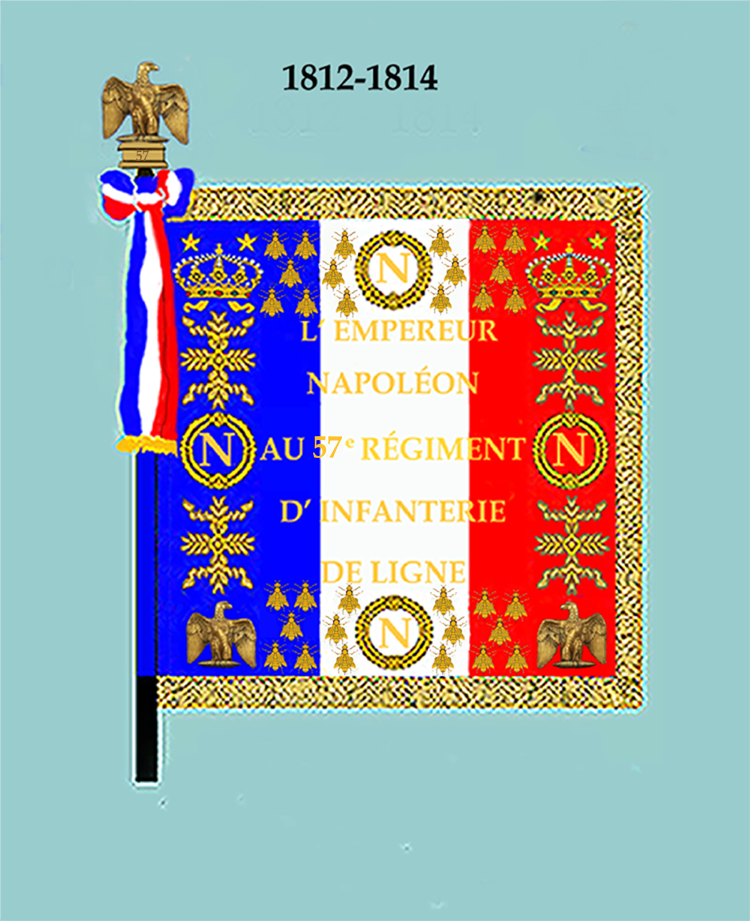
57e régiment d'infanterie colour 1812-1814.

=== 1815-1848 ===
After Napoleon's second abdication, the Bourbon Government reorganized the French Imperial Army. The 57e was disbanded, and its men were placed into another royal regiments. However, it was later reformed with the battalions of the Tarn Legion in 1820.

Later in 1827–1828, France joined the Greek War of Independence on Greece's side. Upon France's entry into the war, the 57th Regiment was garrisoned in Briançon in May 1830, and they sent two battalions to sail towards the west coast of the Peloponnese. Both of the battalions departed from Toulon with the French frigate ship Galathée.They arrived at Navarino Bay or Pylos on July 15. The first Battalion, and a few elite companies of the second Battalion were stationed at Methoni. While the remains of the 2nd Battalion stayed at Pylos.

=== World War I ===
During World War I 1914–1918, the 57th regiment participated in a few major battles on the Western Front such as the Battle of Charleroi, the Battle of Guise, the Battle of Verdun, and other battles that took place on the Western Front against the German Empire in their 1914-1918 campaign.

At the beginning of the war, the 57th regiment was mobilized then garrisoned in Rochefort, and Libourne before deployed to Belgium, and Northern France. Its first battle was on 23 August 1914 in Battle of Charleroi. They later participate First Battle of the Marne on 7 September 1914 as well with other subsequent engagements along the Aisne front, Battle of Verdun in 1916, Plateau de Vauclerc in 1917, and the Hurtebise area during the Nivelle Offensive's assault on the Chemin des Dames ridge in April–May 1917. The 57th regiment also adopted the new Horizon Blue uniforms, and Adrian steel helmets like the other French regiment as the war progressed.

=== WW2 ===
In early outbreak of the World War II, the regiment was reconstituted on September 4, 1939, under the command of Lieutenant-Colonel Sinais. They're later assigned to the 36th Infantry Division. In 1940, during the German invasion, the 57th regiment fought in the Ardennes/Rethel region. On 9–10 June 1940, they engaged the German's forces near Voncq. Their actions reportedly earned the regiment an army-level citation before the French retreated.

After the Liberation in 1944, 57th Regiment was reorganized again with former members of Forces françaises de l'intérieur (FFI) from several southwestern départements on 16 December 1944. After Post-WW2 this regiment was dissolved in 1946 following with FFI serving in occupation duties in the 1945. The regiment was disbanded again as part of post-war army restructuring.
