= Battle of Baza =

1810 battle during the Peninsular War

Battle of Baza (1810)
- Part of Peninsular War
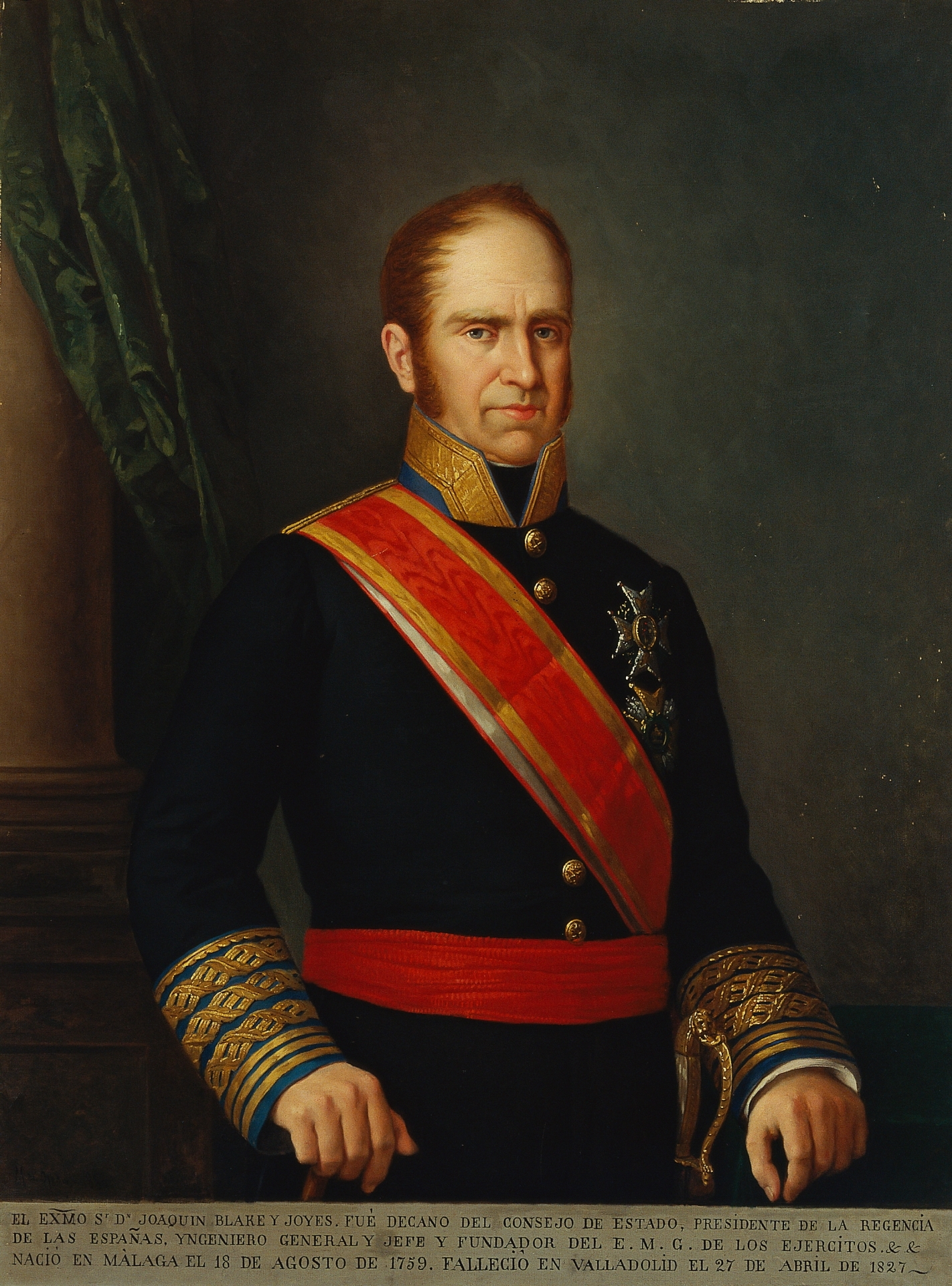
- Joaquín Blake was beaten when he let his corps get spread out.
Date	4 November 1810
Location	Baza, Granada, Spain 37°29′N 2°46′W
Result	French victory

Belligerents
(First French Empire) French Empire; Duchy of Warsaw	Kingdom of Spain

Commanders and leaders
(First French Empire) Édouard Milhaud	(Spain) Joaquín Blake

Strength
3,300	9,000; 12 guns

Casualties and losses
200	1,500; 6 guns

Peninsular War: Siege of Cádiz
current battle

In the Battle of Baza on 4 November 1810 an Imperial French force commanded by General Milhaud fought a Spanish corps led by General Blake. When the Spanish commander allowed his forces to get spread out, Milhaud attacked with his cavalry and crushed Blake's vanguard with heavy losses. The Spanish force retreated into the province of Murcia. Baza is located on Route 342 about 80 kilometres (50 mi) north of Almería. The battle occurred during the Peninsular War, part of the Napoleonic Wars.

After King Joseph Bonaparte's army overran Andalusia, it meant that he had increased the territory his soldiers had to defend. French Marshal Soult's three corps were kept busy fending off constant Spanish and British threats to the province from land and sea. At Baza, the French successfully drove away one Spanish column. Within a few months, there would be another clash at Barrosa.

== Background ==
On 18 and 19 November 1809, the main Spanish army suffered a catastrophic defeat at the Battle of Ocaña. A week later, a second Spanish army was beaten at the Battle of Alba de Tormes. As the Spanish frantically tried to cobble together a new army to defend the south of Spain, King Joseph Bonaparte decided to invade the province of Andalusia. With his royal treasury nearly empty, the king desired to incorporate the wealthy region into his domain.

In January 1810, Marshal Victor had 22,664 effectives in the I Corps. Victor commanded three infantry divisions, one 2,260-strong dragoon division, and 823 troopers in one light cavalry brigade. General of Division Sébastiani led 10,125 men of the IV Corps. This formation included two weak infantry divisions, one 1,721-man dragoon division, and one 1,351-strong light cavalry brigade. Marshal Mortier supervised the 16,612-man V Corps. Mortier counted two strong infantry divisions and one 2,127-man cavalry division. Additionally, there were 8,354 reinforcements available to Joseph.

Joseph's army swiftly overran Andalusia during the months of January and February 1810. However, they failed to capture Cádiz and that island city successfully held out against the French from 5 February 1810 until 25 August 1812. Soon after, Emperor Napoleon appointed Marshal Nicolas Soult to control Andalusia. The marshal soon found it difficult to defend the newly conquered territory against multiple threats. Soult deployed Mortier's V Corps to defend the Portuguese border to the northwest. The IV Corps watched the Murcian frontier to the east. Victor and the I Corps maintained the Siege of Cádiz. Because the British navy had control of the seas, it could easily transport British and Spanish troops to menace French-held locations on the coast. On 13 October 1810, one of these raids resulted in an embarrassing repulse of the British in the Battle of Fuengirola.

== Battle ==
In August 1810, Sébastiani's IV Corps appeared before the city of Murcia. The French corps commander found Blake's troops manning powerful defensive works around the city. When he learned that Spanish guerillas had captured two small Andalusian ports and were on the outskirts of Granada, Sébastiani quickly abandoned his attempt to capture Murcia and hurried back to save Granada.

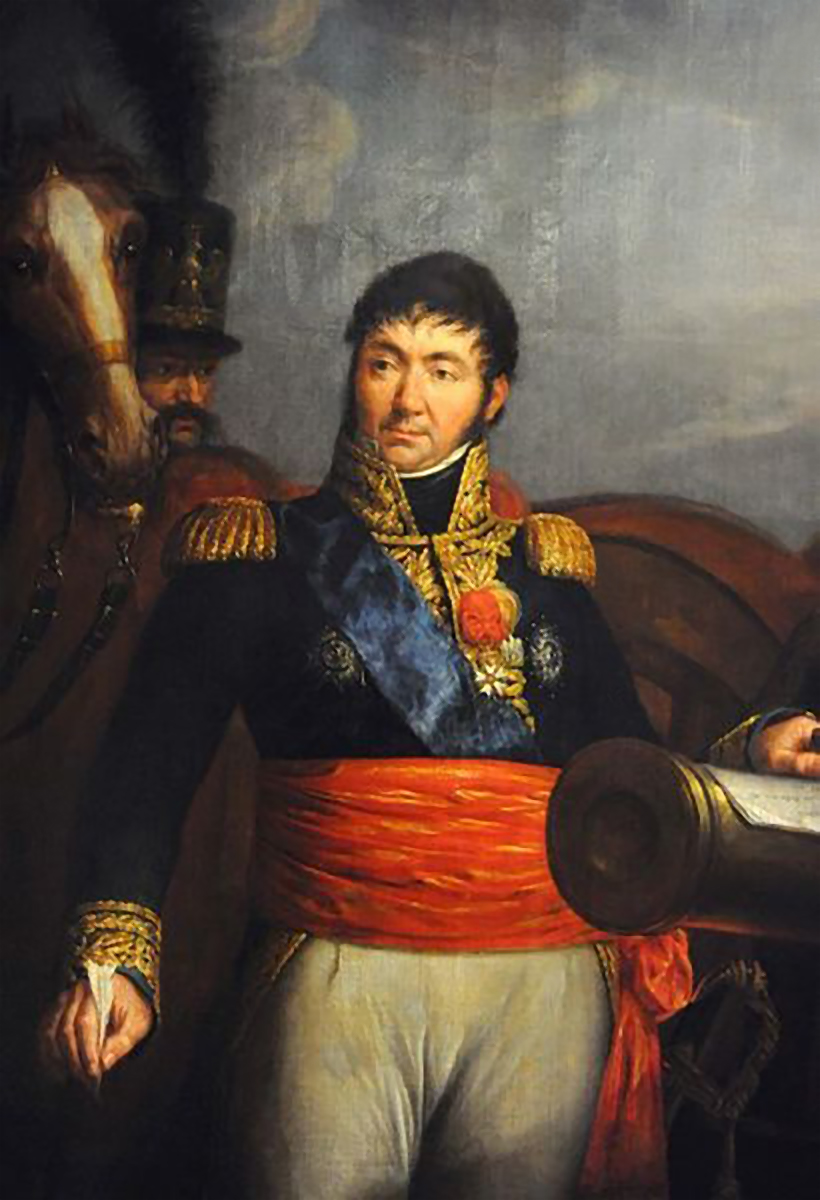
Édouard Milhaud

After hovering on the Murcia-Andalusia border for several weeks, Blake advanced on 2 November with 8,000 infantry and 1,000 cavalry. The Spanish general occupied Cúllar on the 3rd and continued to advance. Carelessly allowing his corps to become spread out, Blake's advance guard of cavalry and 3,000 infantry camped near Baza on the evening of 3 November. Meanwhile, his 2,000-man rear guard remained near Cúllar while his remaining division was located between the two towns. When he heard of the Spanish incursion, General Milhaud marched his cavalry to Baza, arriving on the morning of the 4th. Milhaud joined the 2,000 French infantry who were already holding Baza.

General of Brigade Rey commanded a brigade from Sebastiani's 1st Division which included one battalion of the 32nd Line Infantry Regiment and three battalions of the 58th Line. Milhaud's 1,300-strong cavalry division was made up of the 5th, 12th, 16th, 20th, and 21st Dragoon Regiments and the Polish lancers of the Legion of the Vistula. The French also had two horse artillery batteries. Blake had 12 guns in addition to the infantry and cavalry already enumerated.

Deploying on both sides of the main highway, Milhaud charged Blake's cavalry and routed it. As the Spanish horsemen galloped away, they disrupted their own infantry formations. When the French dragoons and Polish lancers bore down on the surprised and shaken Spanish foot soldiers, the men scattered in flight. Milhaud's horsemen cut Blake's vanguard to pieces, cutting down many soldiers and capturing many prisoners. But when the French encountered the second Spanish division drawn up in rough terrain, they refrained from attacking. Blake immediately ordered a retreat to Cúllar.

== Result ==
For the loss of 200 killed and wounded, all in the cavalry, Milhaud's force inflicted 500 killed and wounded on the Spanish. In addition, the French captured 1,000 soldiers. Smith stated that the Spanish lost all 12 guns. Blake returned to Murcia where he remained quiescent for the rest of the year. The next action in the area was the Battle of Barrosa on 5 March 1811 where British Lieutenant General Thomas Graham inflicted a defeat on Victor's corps.
