= General Ray =

General Ray may refer to:

- Arjun Ray (general) (born 1944), Indian Army lieutenant general
- Patrick Henry Ray (1842–1911), U.S. Army brigadier general
- Timothy Ray (fl. 1980s–2020s), U.S. Air Force general

== See also ==
- Alain Le Ray (1910–2007), French Army general
- General Rey (disambiguation)
