= General Rea =

General Rea may refer to:

- Joaquín Rea (died 1850), Mexican general in the Mexican–American War
- John Rea (politician) (1755–1829), Pennsylvania Militia major general in the War of 1812
- Leonard E. Rea (1897–1972), U.S. Marine Corps major general

== See also ==
- General Rey (disambiguation)
