= Jean-Pierre-Antoine Rey =

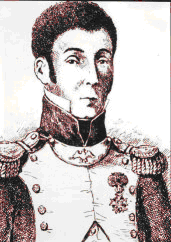
- Born: 21 December 1767
- Died: 12 January 1842 (aged 74)
- Allegiance: France
- Branch: French Army
- Service years: 11 October 1803–1813 (recorded)
- Rank: General of Brigade
- Commands: 57th Infantry Line Regiment
- Awards: Légion d'Honneur

Jean-Pierre-Antoine Rey (21 December 1767 – 12 January 1842) commanded a famous French infantry regiment during the Napoleonic Wars and became a general officer in 1808. He led an infantry brigade in a number of actions in Spain and France. His brother Louis Emmanuel Rey was a French general of brigade who also served in Spain during the Peninsular War. Since most sources do not distinguish between the generals named Rey, the two are easily confused.

== Early career ==
Rey was born on 21 December 1767. He became colonel of the 57th Line Infantry Regiment on 11 November 1803. In the War of the Third Coalition the 57th fought at the Battles of Memmingen, Ulm, and Austerlitz. At Austerlitz on 2 December 1805, the regiment fought in Dominique Vandamme's division of Marshal Nicolas Soult's IV Corps. On 25 December 1805, Rey received the Commandant's Cross of the Légion d'Honneur.

== Peninsular War 1808–1809 ==
The Dos de Mayo Uprising in May 1808 rendered the French occupation of Spain insecure. Among other units sent to Spain to reinforce the Imperial French units already there were ten veteran battalions under Georges Mouton. Dropping off one brigade at Vitoria, Mouton joined the army of Marshal Jean-Baptiste Bessières and fought at the Battle of Medina de Rioseco on 14 July 1808. Hilaire Benoît Reynaud's brigade with 3,000 men of the 4th Light and 15th Line Infantry Regiments participated in the battle. The troops left at Vitoria were commanded by Rey, a newly minted brigadier. The brigade consisted of the 1st and 2nd Battalions of the 2nd Light and 12th Line Infantry Regiments and one battalion of the Garde de Paris.

On 9 November 1808, Marshal Nicolas Soult replaced Bessières in command of the II Corps with Mouton's troops designated the 1st Division. The next day, Soult crushed an outclassed Spanish army at the Battle of Burgos. Seeing the Spanish deployed in a bad position, the French marshal placed Édouard Jean Baptiste Milhaud's dragoon division on the left, Antoine Lasalle's light cavalry in the center, and Mouton's infantry on the right. Not bothering to wait for divisions under Pierre Hugues Victoire Merle and Jean Pierre François Bonet to arrive, Soult ordered an attack. After a cavalry charge collapsed the Spanish right wing, Lasalle's horsemen swung to take the left wing in flank while Mouton's foot soldiers mounted a frontal attack. In the subsequent slaughter, French losses were probably less than 200 while the Spanish may have lost 2,500 killed and wounded and another 900 captured. The same regiments fought under Merle at the Battle of Corunna on 16 January 1809, but Rey was no longer with the division by that time. The brigadiers were Reynaud, Jacques Thomas Sarrut, and Jean Guillaume Barthélemy Thomières.

At the Battle of Talavera on 28 July 1809, Rey led a brigade in the IV Corps division of Horace François Sébastiani. Sébastiani arranged his brigades side by side in two lines. Therefore, the six battalions of Rey's 28th Line Infantry Regiment and Louis Ligier-Bellair's 58th Line were in the front line. Their initial attack was launched against the British 61st Foot and the Guards Brigade. Ignoring the French musketry, the red coats waited until their enemies were 50 yards (46 m) away before firing a murderous volley. The front ranks of French soldiers were mowed down and the survivors took to their heels with the British infantry in enthusiastic pursuit. The 61st Foot soon halted, but the British Guards chased their enemies too far. The routed French battalions rallied behind the second line and, with the help of their powerful artillery, defeated and threw back the Guards. A second French attack rolled forward, threatening to burst through the mauled enemy formations. The British commander Arthur Wellesley quickly brought up Alexander Randoll Mackenzie's brigade and there was a deadly musketry duel for twenty minutes before the second French attack was beaten back. Losses were appalling on both sides. Sebastiani's division suffered 2,100 casualties, of whom only 60 were made prisoners. The butcher's bill included all four colonels wounded, seven of 12 battalion commanders, and 70 other officers. On the British side, Mackenzie was killed and his brigade lost 632 casualties out of roughly 2,000. The Guards lost 611 out of 2,000. The 61st Foot lost 265 men. The second line units in Sébastiani's division were the 32nd and 75th Line Infantry Regiments.

== Peninsular War 1810–1814 ==
Spanish General Joaquín Blake y Joyes Blake advanced from the Murcian border on 2 November 1810 with 8,000 infantry and 1,000 cavalry. Cúllar was reached on the 3rd and the small Spanish army kept going. Blake committed a serious blunder by allowing his troops to become badly spread out. His advance guard of cavalry and 3,000 infantry bivouacked near Baza on the evening of the 3rd. His 2,000-man rear guard camped near Cúllar while his remaining division was situated between the two towns. Defending Baza was Rey with a brigade from Sebastiani's 1st Division. Rey's force counted one battalion of the 32nd Line Infantry Regiment and three battalions of the 58th Line.

But help was on the way. Receiving news of the Spanish invasion, Édouard Milhaud marched his cavalry to Baza. He reaching there early on 4 November 1810 and united his horsemen with Rey's 2,000 French infantry. Milhaud brought 1,300 cavalrymen, including the 5th, 12th, 16th, 20th, and 21st Dragoon Regiments and the Polish lancers of the Legion of the Vistula. The French also had two horse artillery batteries. Blake had 12 guns in addition to the 1st and 2nd Divisions of the Army of the Center. Arranging his troopers on both sides of the main highway, Milhaud ordered a cavalry charge. The French horsemen plowed into Blake's horsemen and scattered them. As the Spanish cavalry fled, they rode through their own infantry formations. When the French dragoons and Polish lancers galloped toward the disordered Spanish infantry, the men took to their heels. The Imperial French horsemen completely smashed Blake's vanguard, hacking down scores of soldiers and capturing hundreds of others. When the French came upon Blake's second division deployed in difficult terrain, they stopped their charge. Blake quickly ordered a retreat. In the Battle of Baza the French lost 200 killed and wounded. The cavalry won the battle and Rey's infantry suffered negligible losses. Blake's army lost 500 killed and wounded and 1,000 soldiers captured.

In February 1812, Francisco Ballesteros with 2,000 Spanish infantry and 300 cavalry attempted to seize the port of Málaga. On the 16th the Spanish force bumped into Jean-Pierre Maransin with 2,000 French infantry and 400 cavalry at the village of Cártama. Ballesteros claimed to have killed Maransin and cut down 1,200 of his men. In fact, Maransin was wounded and his troops suffered about 150 casualties. The Spanish force retreated when Rey appeared with 2,500 foot and 200 horse and aimed an attack at Ballesteros' flank.

In 1814, he commanded a brigade in Eloi Charlemagne Taupin’s division at the battle of Toulouse in 1814, first in the defence of Saint-Cyprien, the suburb of Toulouse on the left bank of the river Garonne, and then in the defence of Mont Calvinet. He survived the battle, and served both the new government and Napoleon’s during the Hundred Days. He remained on the reserve list at his home in rue Foulimou, Puylaurens.
