= Louis Emmanuel Rey =

18/19th-century French soldier

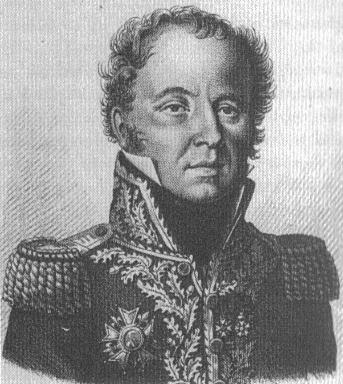
- Louis Emmanuel Rey
- Born: 22 September 1768; Grenoble, France
- Died: 18 June 1846 (aged 77) Paris, France
- Allegiance: France
- Branch: Infantry
- Service years: 1784–1815
- Rank: General of Division
- Conflicts: French Revolutionary Wars; Napoleonic Wars
- Awards: Baron of the Empire; Légion d'Honneur

Louis Emmanuel Rey (born 22 September 1768, Grenoble – died 18 June 1846, Paris) was a French soldier. He joined the French royal army and won rapid promotion to general officer during the French Revolutionary Wars. He continued to serve the First French Empire during the Napoleonic Wars. He fought in the Peninsular War and led a tenacious defense of San Sebastián, Spain in 1813. His is one of the names inscribed under the Arc de Triomphe.

== Early career ==
In 1784 at the age of 16, Rey joined the French royal army's Regiment de Monsieur, which became the 75th Line Infantry Regiment in 1791. Promoted to sergeant-major in 1791, he earned a lieutenant's commission in 1792. From that year, he served four years in the Army of the Alps with distinction and won promotion to general of brigade in 1796. For a time, he commanded a camp at Lyon that reorganized units passing from the Vendée to the Army of Italy.

== Empire ==
When the Grande Armée left the shores of the English Channel to fight in the War of the Third Coalition, Rey was given command of the Camp de Boulogne from 1805 to 1808. In the latter year he was named a Baron of the Empire. He served as chief of staff in Laurent Gouvion Saint-Cyr's VII Corps in Catalonia beginning in August 1808. It is likely that he commanded a brigade at the Battle of Ocaña in November 1809. One source stated that Rey led 3,500 men in six battalions. It is probable that his brigade included three battalions each of the 12th Light and 43rd Line Infantry Regiments. At the Battle of Baza on 4 November 1810, he led a brigade from Horace Sebastiani de la Porta's 1st Division of the IV Corps consisting of one battalion of the 32nd Line Infantry Regiment and three battalions of the 58th Line. He fought at the Siege of Tarragona in 1811. Historian David G. Chandler noted that Rey was appointed governor of the fortress of San Sebastián in August 1811. Another source asserted that Rey was defeated by Francisco Ballesteros at Alhaurín el Grande on 14 April 1812. On this occasion he led a force of 3,000 men made up of three squadrons of the 21st Dragoon Regiment, two artillery pieces, and three battalions divided between the 43rd and 58th Line Infantry Regiments. French losses numbered 200 and included both guns.

From 5 July to 9 September 1813 Rey conducted an extremely able defense of San Sebastián. In relating the story of the siege, Historian David Gates called Rey, "a commander of the first order." The army of the Marquess of Wellington shipped 40 heavy siege cannon and large quantities of supplies to the nearby port of Pasajes in early July. Wellington assigned Thomas Graham, 1st Baron Lynedoch the British 5th Division and a Portuguese brigade to undertake the siege operation. An attempt to rush an outlying defense, the San Bartholomé Monastery, failed on 15 July. A heavier bombardment and attack pried the French defenders from the monastery two days later, but the Allied infantry gave chase and were bloodily repulsed with 200 casualties at the main defenses. The Anglo-Portuguese siege guns went to work and opened a small breach on the east side. Meanwhile, the British engineers discovered an old sewer which they utilized to place a mine under the southern defenses.

Rey sealed off the breach with internal defenses, manned the nearby buildings with marksmen, and zeroed in his artillery on the threatened area. At dawn on 25 July, Graham's attack went forward. The mine exploded, doing some damage, but the French easily drove off the southern Allied attack, which was only a diversion. Led by the Royal Scots, the main column splashed across the Rio Urumea estuary at low tide and assaulted the breach from the east. After the attackers reached the top of the breach, the French opened fire and the result was a massacre. The stunned British infantry stampeded, carrying away their supporting battalions. The attackers suffered a loss of 600 killed and wounded, while French casualties were only one-tenth as great. When the incoming tide threatened to drown the many British wounded, Rey generously allowed his soldiers to leave their defenses and rescue them. The onset of the Battle of the Pyrenees that day caused Wellington to order Graham to abandon the siege. As the Allies withdrew their siege guns, Rey launched a surprise sortie that inflicted 200 more casualties and seized some equipment. Shaken by their setbacks, Allied morale dropped and desertion became a problem.

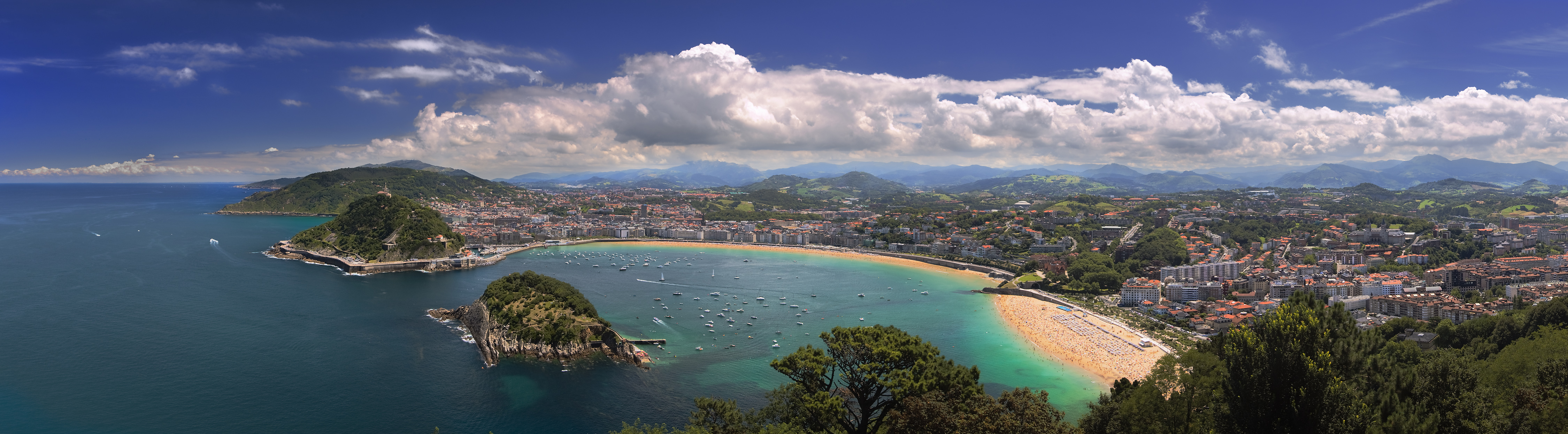
This panoramic view shows San Sebastien from the west. Atop the headland at left center is the La Mota Castle, Rey's last place of refuge.

During the interlude, Rey repaired his southern defenses and thoroughly sealed off the breach with a new wall. He also shipped in fresh troops and supplies through the leaky British naval blockade and sent his sick and wounded soldiers back to France. Rey awaited a return of the Allies with 3,000 infantry and 60 cannon. After defeating the French in the Pyrenees, Graham rearmed his siege batteries, which now numbered 63 heavy guns. On 26 August the bombardment began again and lasted for five days. The Allied artillery knocked out gun after gun and inflicted serious losses among the defenders. The bombardment blasted a 300-yard wide gap in the wall at the southeast corner of the city, plus a second breach farther north. Faced with the loss of most of his cannon, Rey armed each of his 2,500 surviving soldiers with three muskets and grenades. Several defensive mines were placed and rubble cleared from the breaches.

The final assault began at 10:55 am on 31 August when James Leith's 5th Division rushed the main breach from the south while Thomas Bradford's Portuguese brigade stormed the smaller one from the east. After running the gauntlet of mines and small-arms fire, both columns reached the tops of their respective breaches and came under murderous fire. After enduring the one-sided slaughter for nearly 30 minutes, both columns retreated to the base of the wall where the troops hugged the ground to escape the intense fire. In this emergency, Graham ordered his siege guns to fire over the heads of the surviving attackers. This expedient saved the day for the Allies, as the fire ripped apart the inner defenses, inflicting heavy losses on the French. As some of the 5th Division managed to make progress, an accident set off a store of bombs, killing 60 Frenchmen and injuring many more.

Leith's men pushed along the walls toward the lesser breach where they assisted the Portuguese in breaking through. Still undefeated, Rey led his men in a house-to-house battle that finally ended when he and his remaining 1,300 troops took refuge in the La Mota Castle. Meanwhile, the Allied troops went berserk and sacked the city for three days in which the place was virtually destroyed. Ensconced in his hilltop castle, Rey held out against a 60-gun bombardment until 8 September when he finally ran up the white flag. Before being forced to surrender the survivors of his garrison, his soldiers inflicted over 5,000 casualties on their enemies, including Leith who was wounded.

As a reward for his meritorious services, Emperor Napoleon I of France promoted Rey to general of division in November 1813 even though he was a prisoner of war. Historians differ when describing Rey's 1814 service. David G. Chandler writes that he remained in British custody until May 1814. Digby Smith places a General Rey in command of a brigade in Eloi Charlemagne Taupin's division at the battles of Orthez and Toulouse in early 1814, but this was most likely his brother Jean-Pierre-Antoine Rey.

During the Hundred Days Rey rallied to Napoleon and was given command of the fortress of Valenciennes. He sustained a siege by 9,000 Dutch-Belgian troops from 30 June until surrendering on 12 August. After the restoration of the monarchy, he fell out of favor until 1830, when he received a three-year appointment to a royal commission. His military service is honored on Column 37 of the Arc de Triomphe in Paris, with the inscription E^{EL} REY.

== External sources ==
- The Names of 660 persons inscribed on the Arc de Triomphe
