= Battle of Vitoria order of battle =

This is the order of battle for the Battle of Vitoria (21 June 1813).

== Abbreviations used ==
=== Military rank ===
- Gen = General
- Lt Gen = Lieutenant-General
- Maj Gen = Major-General
- GD = général de division
- Brig Gen = Brigadier-General
- GB = général de brigade
- Col = Colonel
- Lt Col = Lieutenant Colonel
- Maj = Major
- Capt = Captain
- Lt = Lieutenant

=== Other ===
- (w) = wounded
- (mw) = mortally wounded
- (k) = killed in action
- (c) = captured

== Allied army ==
Commander-in-Chief: Lt Gen (local General) Arthur Wellesley, 1st Marquess of Wellington

Total Allied Forces: 81,136 (68,222 infantry, 7,715 cavalry, 5,199 artillery and train)

Artillery: Lt Col Alexander Dickson (4,307 gunners and train, approx. 90 guns)

Reserve Artillery (Lt Col Julius Hartmann)

- Webber-Smith's Troop Royal Horse Artillery (RHA)
- Parker's Company Royal Artillery (RA)
- Arriaga's Portuguese Battery

Engineers: 892

=== Right Column ===
Lt Gen Rowland Hill

Division	Brigade	Regiments and Others
2nd Division Lt Gen William Stewart (10,834 total)	1st Brigade Col. the Hon. Henry Cadogan (2,777 total)	1/50th Foot; 1/71st Foot; 1/92nd Foot; coy. 5/60th Rifles
2nd Division Lt Gen William Stewart (10,834 total)	2nd Brigade Maj Gen John Byng (2,465 total)	1/3rd Foot; 1/57th Foot; 1st Provisional Bn. (2/31st & 2/66th Foot); coy. 5/60th Rifles
2nd Division Lt Gen William Stewart (10,834 total)	3rd Brigade Col. the Hon. Robert O'Callaghan (2,530 total)	1/28th Foot; 2/34th Foot; 1/39th Foot; coy. 5/60th Rifles
2nd Division Lt Gen William Stewart (10,834 total)	Portuguese Brigade Brig Gen Charles Ashworth (3,062 total)	6th Portuguese Line (2 bns); 18th Portuguese Line (2 bns); 6th Caçadores
Portuguese Division Maj Gen Francisco Silveira, Count of Amarante (5,287 total)	1st Brigade Brig Gen Hippolita da Costa (2,49 total)	2nd Portuguese Line (2 bns); 14th Portuguese Line (2 bns)
Portuguese Division Maj Gen Francisco Silveira, Count of Amarante (5,287 total)	2nd Brigade Brig Gen Archibald Campbell (2,795 total)	4th Portuguese Line (2 bns); 10th Portuguese Line (2 bns); 10th Caçadores
Spanish Division Maj Gen Pablo Morillo (4,551 total)	Unbrigaded	León; Unión; Legión; Bailén; Victoria; 2nd Jaén
Cavalry (1,847 total)	Light Cavalry Brigade Maj Gen Victor Alten (1,005 total)	14th Light Dragoons; 1st Hussars KGL
Cavalry (1,847 total)	Heavy Cavalry Brigade Maj Gen Henry Fane (842 total)	3rd Dragoon Guards; 1st Dragoons
Artillery Maj. Joseph Carncross		Beane's Troop RHA (attached to Cavalry); Maxwell's Company RA (attached to 2nd Division); Tulloh's 2 Portuguese batteries of Cunas and Mitchell (attached to Portuguese Division)
Total Right Column: 22,519 (20,672 infantry, 1,847 cavalry)

=== Right Centre Column ===
Lt Gen Lowry Cole

Division	Brigade	Regiments and Others
4th Division Lt Gen Lowry Cole (7,286 total)	1st Brigade Maj Gen William Anson (2,395 total)	3/27th Foot; 1/40th Foot; 1/48th Foot; 2nd Provisional Bn. (2nd & 2/53rd Foot); coy. 5/60th Rifles
4th Division Lt Gen Lowry Cole (7,286 total)	2nd (Fusilier) Brigade Maj Gen John Byne Skerrett (2,049 total)	1/7th Fusiliers; 20th Fusiliers; 1/23rd Fusiliers; coy. Brunswick Oels Jäger
4th Division Lt Gen Lowry Cole (7,286 total)	Portuguese Brigade Col. George Stubbs (2,842 total)	11th Portuguese Line (2 bns); 23rd Portuguese Line (2 bns); 7th Caçadores
Light Division Maj Gen Charles Alten (5,484 total)	1st Brigade (2,597 total)	1/43rd Light Infantry; 1/95th Rifles; 3/95th Rifles (5 coys.); 3rd Caçadores
Light Division Maj Gen Charles Alten (5,484 total)	2nd Brigade Maj Gen Sir John Ormsby Vandeleur (2,887 total)	1/52nd Light Infantry; 2/95th Rifles (6 coys.); 17th Portuguese Line; 1st Caçadores
Cavalry (4,417 total)	Household Cavalry Brigade Lieut-Col. Robert Chambre Hill (870 total)	1st Life Guards; 2nd Life Guards; Royal Horse Guards
Cavalry (4,417 total)	Light Cavalry Brigade Col. Colquhoun Grant (1,624 total)	10th Hussars; 15th Hussars; 18th Hussars
Cavalry (4,417 total)	Heavy Cavalry Brigade Maj-Gen William Ponsonby (1,238 total)	5th Dragoon Guards; 3rd Dragoons; 4th Dragoons
Cavalry (4,417 total)	Portuguese Cavalry Brigade Brig-Gen. Benjamin d'Urban (685 total)	1st Portuguese Dragoons; 11th Portuguese Dragoons; 12th Portuguese Dragoons
Artillery Maj Augustus Simon Frazer		Ross' Troop RHA (attached to Light Division); Gardiner's Troop RHA (attached to Cavalry); Ramsay's Troop RHA; Sympher's Battery KGL (attached to 4th Division)
Total Right Centre Column: 17,817 (13,400 infantry, 4,417 cavalry)

=== Left Centre Column ===
Lt Gen George Ramsay, 9th Earl of Dalhousie

Division	Brigade	Regiments and Others
3rd Division Lt Gen Thomas Picton (7,455 total)	1st Brigade Maj Gen Thomas Brisbane (2,723 total)	1/45th Foot; 74th Foot; 1/88th Foot; 3 coys. 5/60th Rifles
3rd Division Lt Gen Thomas Picton (7,455 total)	2nd Brigade Maj Gen Charles Colville (2,272 total)	1/5th Regiment of Foot; 2/83rd Foot; 2/87th Foot; 94th Foot
3rd Division Lt Gen Thomas Picton (7,455 total)	Portuguese Brigade Maj Gen Manley Power (2,460 total)	9th Portuguese Line (2 bns); 21st Portuguese Line (2 bns); 11th Caçadores
7th Division Lt Gen the Earl of Dalhousie (7,297 total)	1st Brigade Maj Gen Edward Barnes (2,322 total)	1/6th Foot; 3rd Provisional Bn. (2/24th & 2/58th Foot); 7 coys. Brunswick Oels Jäger
7th Division Lt Gen the Earl of Dalhousie (7,297 total)	2nd Brigade Col. William Grant (2,538 total)	51st Light Infantry; 68th Light Infantry; 1/82nd Foot; Chasseurs Britanniques
7th Division Lt Gen the Earl of Dalhousie (7,297 total)	Portuguese Brigade Maj Gen Frederico Le Cor (2,437 total)	7th Portuguese Line (2 bns); 19th Portuguese Line (2 bns); 2nd Caçadores
Artillery Maj Richard Buckner		Cairnes' Company RA (attached to 7th Division); Douglas' Company RA (attached to 3rd Division)
Total Left Centre Column: 14,752 infantry

=== Left Column ===
Lt Gen Thomas Graham

Division	Brigade	Regiments and Others
1st Division Maj Gen Kenneth Howard (4,854 total)	1st (Guards) Brigade Maj Gen the Hon. Edward Stopford (1,728 total)	1/Coldstream Guards; 1/3rd Guards; coy. 5/60th Rifles
1st Division Maj Gen Kenneth Howard (4,854 total)	2nd Brigade Col. Colin Halkett (3,126 total)	1st Line Bn, KGL; 2nd Line Bn, KGL; 5th Line Bn, KGL; 1st Light Bn, KGL; 2nd Light Bn, KGL
5th Division Maj Gen John Oswald (6,725 total)	1st Brigade (2,292 total)	3/1st Foot; 1/9th Foot; 1/38th Foot; coy. Brunswick Oels Jäger
5th Division Maj Gen John Oswald (6,725 total)	2nd Brigade Maj Gen Frederick Philipse Robinson (2,061 total)	1/4th Foot; 2/47th Foot; 2/59th Foot; coy. Brunswick Oels Jäger
5th Division Maj Gen John Oswald (6,725 total)	Portuguese Brigade Brig Gen Frederick William Spry (2,372 total)	3rd Portuguese Line (2 bns); 15th Portuguese Line (2 bns); 8th Caçadores
Independent Portuguese Brigades (4,689 total)	Pack's Brigade Maj Gen Denis Pack (2,297 total)	1st Portuguese Line (2 bns) - Major Thomas Noel Hill; 16th Portuguese Line (2 bns); 4th Caçadores
Independent Portuguese Brigades (4,689 total)	Bradford's Brigade Maj Gen Thomas Bradford (2,392 total)	13th Portuguese Line (2 bns); 24th Portuguese Line (2 bns); 5th Caçadores
Spanish Division Col. Francisco de Longa (3,130 total)	Unbrigaded	1st Iberia; 2nd Iberia; 3rd Iberia; 4th Iberia; Guardias Nacionales; Húsares de Iberia; Salcedo's Guerilla Corps
Cavalry (1,451 total)	Light Cavalry Brigade Maj Gen George Anson (819 total)	12th Light Dragoons; 16th Light Dragoons
Cavalry (1,451 total)	Heavy Cavalry Brigade Maj Gen George Bock (632 total)	1st Dragoons KGL; 2nd Dragoons KGL
Artillery		Dubordieu's Battery RA (attached to 1st Division); Lawson's Company RA (attached to 5th Division)
Total Anglo-Portuguese Forces: 20,849 (19,398 infantry, 1,451 cavalry)

From Glover (2001), The Peninsular War, pp. 382-385 unless otherwise cited.

== French Army ==
Commander-in-Chief: King Joseph Bonaparte

Chief of Staff: Marshal Jean-Baptiste Jourdan

French Army total: 69,212 (51,645 infantry, 11,002 cavalry, 6,565 artillery and train, 151 guns)

=== Army of the South ===
GD Honoré Gazan

Division	Brigade	Regiments and Others
1st Division GD Jean François Leval (4,844 total)	1st Brigade GB Georges Alexis Mocquery (2,579 total)	9th Légère; 24th Ligne
1st Division GD Jean François Leval (4,844 total)	2nd Brigade GB Jacques Polycarpe Morgan (2,099 total)	88th Ligne; 96th Ligne
1st Division GD Jean François Leval (4,844 total)	Artillery	One battery (166)
3rd Division GD Eugène-Casimir Villatte (5,874 total)	1st Brigade GB Antoine Rignoux (2,578 total)	27th Légère; 63rd Ligne
3rd Division GD Eugène-Casimir Villatte (5,874 total)	2nd Brigade GB Étienne Nicolas Lefol (3,113 total)	94th Ligne; 95th Ligne
3rd Division GD Eugène-Casimir Villatte (5,874 total)	Artillery	One battery (183)
4th Division GD Nicolas François Conroux (6,589 total)	1st Brigade GB Jean-Pierre-Antoine Rey (3,669 total)	32nd Ligne; 43rd Ligne
4th Division GD Nicolas François Conroux (6,589 total)	2nd Brigade GB Henri César Auguste Schwiter (2,717 total)	55th Ligne; 58th Ligne
4th Division GD Nicolas François Conroux (6,589 total)	Artillery	One battery (193)
5th Division (detachment) (2,927 total)	1st Brigade GB Jean-Pierre Maransin (2,927 total)	12th Légère; 45th Ligne
6th Division GD Augustin Darricau (5,700 total)	1st Brigade GB Louis Paul Baille de Saint-Pol (2,711 total)	21st Légère; 100th Ligne
6th Division GD Augustin Darricau (5,700 total)	2nd Brigade GB Victor Urbain Remond (2,984 total)	28th Légère; 103rd Ligne
6th Division GD Augustin Darricau (5,700 total)	Artillery	One battery (240)
1st Cavalry Division GD Pierre Benoît Soult (1,502 total)	1st Brigade GB Gilbert Julian Vinot	2nd Hussars; 21st Chasseurs à Cheval
1st Cavalry Division GD Pierre Benoît Soult (1,502 total)	2nd Brigade GB	5th Chasseurs à Cheval; 10th Chasseurs à Cheval
1st Cavalry Division GD Pierre Benoît Soult (1,502 total)	Artillery	Horse Artillery battery (169)
2nd Cavalry Division GD Jacques Delaistre de Tilly (1,929 total)	1st Brigade GB Pierre Ismert	2nd Dragoons; 4th Dragoons
2nd Cavalry Division GD Jacques Delaistre de Tilly (1,929 total)	2nd Brigade GB François Léon Ormancey	14th Dragoons; 26th Dragoons
3rd Cavalry Division GD Alexandre, vicomte Digeon (1,692 total)	1st Brigade GB	16th Dragoons; 21st Dragoons
3rd Cavalry Division GD Alexandre, vicomte Digeon (1,692 total)	2nd Brigade GB	5th Dragoons; 12th Dragoons
3rd Cavalry Division GD Alexandre, vicomte Digeon (1,692 total)	Artillery	Horse Artillery battery (177)
Auxiliary Troops (1,883 total)		Artillery Reserve: Two batteries (370); Artillery Park: (713); Engineers: (630); Gendarmerie: (105); Wagon Train: (65)
Total Army of the South: 33,511 (25,377 infantry, 5,123 cavalry, 3,011 auxiliary)

=== Army of the Centre ===
GD Jean-Baptiste Drouet, Comte d'Erlon

Division	Brigade	Regiments and Others
1st Division GD Jean Barthélemy Darmagnac (4,472 total)	1st Brigade GB David Hendrik Chassé (1,794 total)	28th Ligne; 75th Ligne
1st Division GD Jean Barthélemy Darmagnac (4,472 total)	2nd (German) Brigade GB Karl von Neuenstein (2,678 total)	2nd Nassau Infantry; 4th Baden Infantry; Frankfort Infantry
2nd Division GD Louis Victorin Cassagne (5,209 total)	1st Brigade Col. Joseph Braun	16th Légère; 8th Ligne
2nd Division GD Louis Victorin Cassagne (5,209 total)	2nd Brigade GB Jacques Blondeau	51st Ligne; 54th Ligne
1st Cavalry Division GD Anne-François-Charles Trelliard (1,038 total)		13th Dragoons; 18th Dragoons; 19th Dragoons; 22nd Dragoons
2nd Cavalry Division GD Antoine Sylvain Avy (474 total)		27th Chasseurs à Cheval; Nassau Chasseurs à Cheval
Auxiliary Troops (830 total)		Artillery: Three batteries (501); Engineers: (131); Wagon Train, etc.: (198)
Total Army of the Centre: 12,023 (9,681 infantry, 1,512 cavalry, 830 auxiliary)

=== Army of Portugal ===
GD Honoré Charles Reille

Division	Brigade	Regiments and Others
4th Division GD Jacques Thomas Sarrut (mw) (4,802 total)	1st Brigade GB Joseph François Fririon	2nd Légère; 36th Ligne
4th Division GD Jacques Thomas Sarrut (mw) (4,802 total)	2nd Brigade GB Jean Baptiste Pierre Menne	4th Légère; 65th Ligne
4th Division GD Jacques Thomas Sarrut (mw) (4,802 total)	Artillery	One battery
6th Division GD Thomas Mignot de Lamartinière (6,711 total)	1st Brigade GB (2,567 total)	118th Ligne; 119th Ligne
6th Division GD Thomas Mignot de Lamartinière (6,711 total)	2nd Brigade GB (3,968 total)	120th Ligne; 122nd Ligne
6th Division GD Thomas Mignot de Lamartinière (6,711 total)	Artillery	One battery (176)
1st Cavalry Division GD Julien Augustin Joseph Mermet (1,801 total)	1st Brigade GB Jean Baptiste Théodore Curto (902 total)	13th Chasseurs à Cheval; 22nd Chasseurs à Cheval
1st Cavalry Division GD Julien Augustin Joseph Mermet (1,801 total)	2nd Brigade (unknown commander) (899 total)	3rd Hussars; 14th Chasseurs à Cheval; 26th Chasseurs à Cheval
2nd Cavalry Division GB Pierre François Xavier Boyer (1,471 total)		6th Dragoons; 11th Dragoons; 15th Dragoons; 25th Dragoons
Auxiliary Troops (2,455 total)		Reserve Artillery: Four foot and one horse batteries (390); Pontoniers: (773); Engineers: (195); Gendarmerie: (174); Wagon Train: (933)
Total Army of Portugal: 17,240 (11,337 infantry, 3,272 cavalry, 2,631 auxiliary)

=== King Joseph's Spanish Army ===
Division	Brigade	Regiments and Others
Royal Guard GB Nicolas Philippe Guye (2,805 total)	Infantry (2,380 total)	Guard Grenadiers (French); Guard Skirmishers (French); Guard Fusiliers (Spanish)
Royal Guard GB Nicolas Philippe Guye (2,805 total)	Cavalry (425 total)	Guard Lancers (French); Guard Hussars (Spanish)
Troops of the Line (Spanish) Gen Casapalacios (2,833 total)	Infantry (2,070 total)	1st Line Regiment "Toledo"; 1st Light Regiment "Castile"; Royal Foreign Regiment
Troops of the Line (Spanish) Gen Casapalacios (2,833 total)	Cavalry (670 total)	1st Spanish Chasseurs à Cheval; 2nd Spanish Chasseurs à Cheval; Guadalajara Hussars
Army of the North		Mixed detachment (800)
Artillery		One battery (93)
Total King Joseph's Spanish Army: 6,438 (5,250 infantry, 1,095 cavalry, 93 artillery)

From Fletcher (2005), Vittoria 1813, pp. 32-33 unless otherwise cited. |- |}
