= Battle of Memmingen =

1805 battle during the War of the Third Coalition

- Part of the Ulm campaign within the War of the Third Coalition
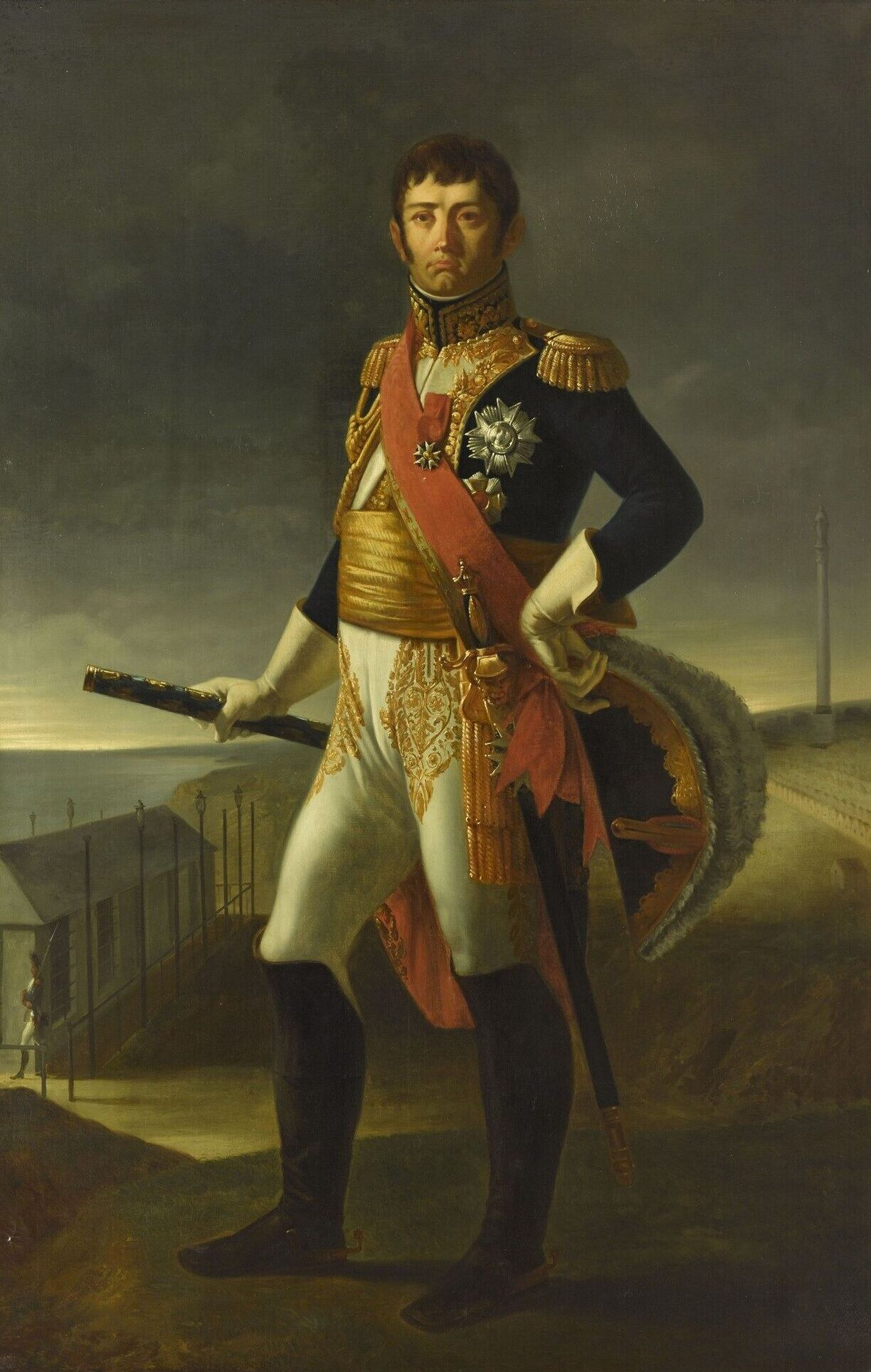
- Jean-de-Dieu Soult
| Date | 14 October 1805 |
| Location | Memmingen, modern-day Germany 47°59′16″N 10°10′52″E |
| Result | French victory |

Belligerents
| France | Austrian Empire |

Commanders and leaders
| (First French Empire) Jean-de-Dieu Soult | (Austrian Empire) Karl Spangen |

Strength
| 20,000 | 6,000 |

Casualties and losses
| 16 killed or wounded | 4,500 prisoners |

War of the Third Coalition:
Ulm Campaign
current battle
Napoleon in command
Napoleon not in command

The Battle of Memmingen was a battle at Memmingen during the 1805 German campaign of the Napoleonic Wars. It occurred on 14 October that year and culminated in the surrender of Karl Spangen to Jean-de-Dieu Soult's 4th Army Corps.

== Course ==
After the crossing of the Danube on 7 October at the battle of Donauwörth, the Grande Armée manoeuvred to the east of Ulm to cut off Karl Mack's force from Mikhail Kutuzov's Russian force to the east and Archduke John's Austrian force to the south. While Michel Ney and Jean Lannes re-crossed the Danube at the battle of Elchingen to cut off the line of advance to Moravia, Soult headed towards Memmingen to cut off the route to the Tyrol.

By 14 October Soult and his 25,440 men and 51 cannon were in place, setting up an artillery bombardment of the town and sending two letters to its governor, Karl Spangen. Spangen believed that the French would carry out their threat to bombard the city and surrendered himself and his 4,500 men and 9 cannon, for a loss of only 16 of Soult's men. After Memmingen was captured, Ulm was completely surrounded on its right bank. Soult's corps was able to stop all Austrian attempts to unite the armies of Ulm and Tyrol, dispersing an Austrian column between Leutkirch and Wurzbach on 19 October.
