= Jean-de-Dieu Soult =

Prime Minister of France and French Marshal (1769–1851)

Marshal General Jean-de-Dieu Soult Duke of Dalmatia
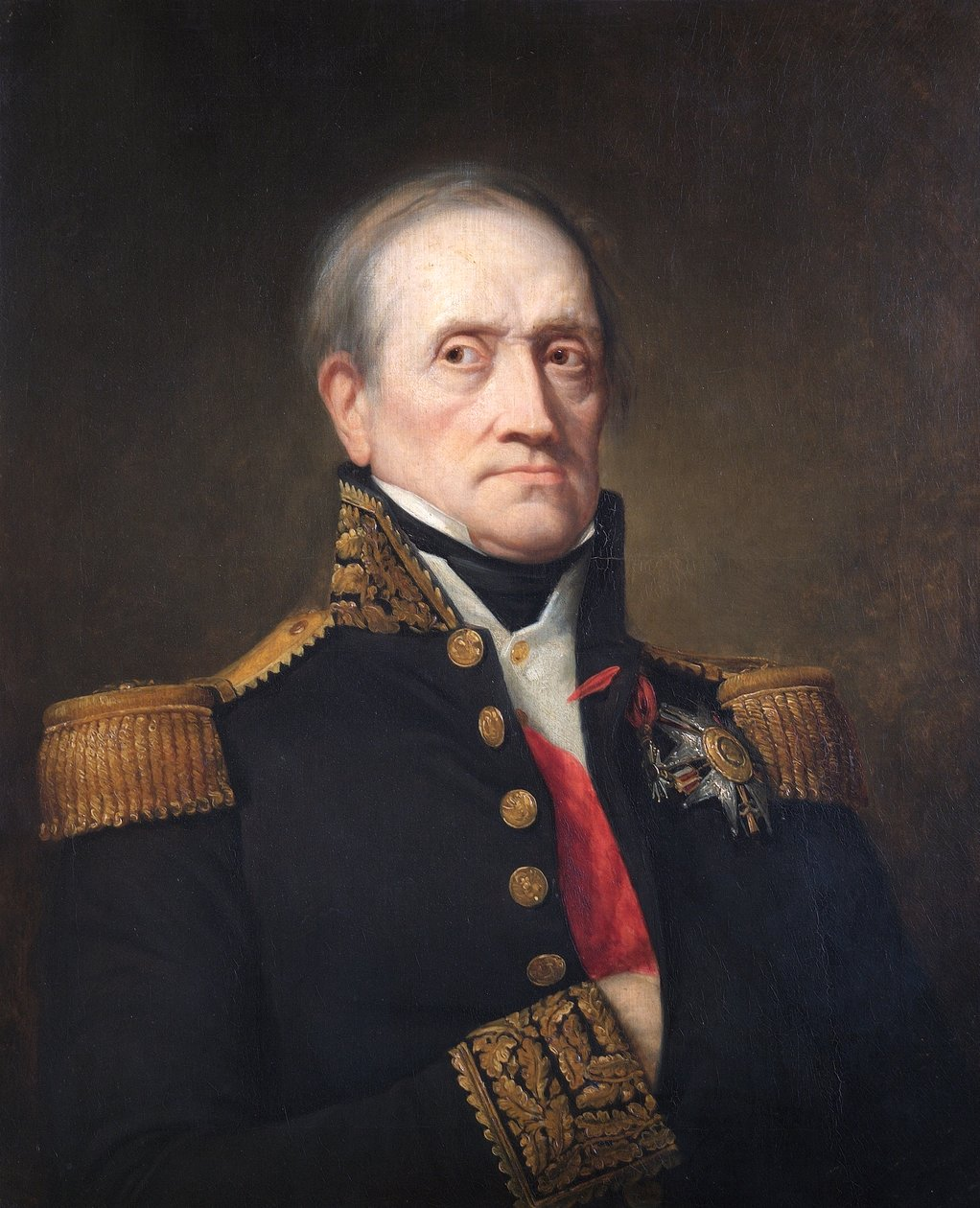
- Portrait of Marshal Soult by George Healy, 1840

Prime Minister of France
- In office 29 October 1840 – 18 September 1847
- Monarch: Louis Philippe I
- Preceded by: Adolphe Thiers
- Succeeded by: François Guizot
- In office 12 May 1839 – 1 March 1840
- Monarch: Louis Philippe I
- Preceded by: Louis-Mathieu Molé
- Succeeded by: Adolphe Thiers
- In office 11 October 1832 – 18 July 1834
- Monarch: Louis Philippe I
- Preceded by: Casimir Périer
- Succeeded by: Étienne Maurice Gérard

Minister of War
- In office 29 October 1840 – 10 November 1845
- Prime Minister: Himself
- Preceded by: Amédée Despans-Cubières
- Succeeded by: Alexandre Moline de Saint-Yon
- In office 17 November 1830 – 18 July 1834
- Prime Minister: Jacques Laffitte; Casimir Périer
- Preceded by: Étienne Maurice Gérard
- Succeeded by: Étienne Maurice Gérard
- In office 26 November 1814 – 11 March 1815
- Prime Minister: Pierre Louis Jean Casimir de Blacas
- Preceded by: Pierre Dupont de l'Étang
- Succeeded by: Henri Clarke

Personal details
- Born: 29 March 1769 Saint-Amans-la-Bastide, France
- Died: 26 November 1851 (aged 82) Saint-Amans-la-Bastide, Tarn, France
- Party: Resistance Party
- Spouse: Jeanne-Louise-Elisabeth Berg (m. 1796; died 1851)
- Children: 3
- Profession: Military officer
- Nickname: "Duke of Damnation" (British)

Military service
- Allegiance: France
- Branch/service: Army
- Years of service: 1785–1815
- Rank: Marshal of the Empire
- Unit: Infantry Royal Regiment; Army of Sambre-et-Meuse; Army of Helvetia; 110th Infantry Regiment
- Battles/wars: See battles: French Revolutionary Wars; War of the First Coalition; Battle of Kaiserslautern; Second Battle of Wissembourg; Battle of Arlon (1794); Battle of Fleurus (1794); Battle of Aldenhoven (1794); Siege of Luxembourg (1794–1795); Battle of Altenkirchen; War of the Second Coalition; Battle of Stockach; First Battle of Zurich; Battle of Linth River; Battle of Muottental; Battle of Glarus; Siege of Genoa; Napoleonic Wars; War of the Third Coalition; Ulm campaign; Battle of Memmingen; Battle of Austerlitz; War of the Fourth Coalition; Battle of Lübeck; Battle of Allenstein; Battle of Guttstadt-Deppen; Peninsular War; Battle of Gamonal; Battle of Mansilla; Battle of Palavea; Battle of Corunna; Battle of Braga (1809); Siege of Chaves; First Battle of Porto; Second Battle of Porto; Battle of Arzobispo; Battle of Ocaña; Siege of Cádiz; Siege of Olivença; Battle of the Gebora; First siege of Badajoz; Battle of Albuera; Battle of Zújar; War of the Sixth Coalition (parallel); Battle of Lützen; Battle of Bautzen; Battle of the Pyrenees; Battle of Sorauren; Battle of San Marcial; Battle of the Bidassoa; Battle of the Nivelle; Battle of the Nive; Battle of Orthez; Battle of Toulouse; War of the Seventh Coalition; Battle of Ligny; Battle of Waterloo

Marshal General Jean-de-Dieu Soult, (Note: Although many sources give Soult's first name as Nicolas, that does not appear on his birth certificate: "Soult's first name is NOT Nicolas", from Soult, Maréchal d'Empire et homme d'État by Nicole Gotteri (édition de la Manufacture). See page 20: "It is therefore perfectly clear that Marshal Soult's first name was Jean de Dieu. The undue addition of 'Nicolas' is only the result of the slander unleashed following the Portuguese campaign [...]". Kaga- (d) 29 December 2011 at 13:26 (CET). "This name [Nicolas] was given to him by his enemies, who accused him of wanting to be crowned King of Spain, since at that time this name meant 'falsifier', 'boaster'" (as per: Les monuments de l'Empire - L'Empire… par ses Monuments, Jean de Dieu Soult (1769-1804-1851), napoleon-monuments.eu).) 1st Duke of Dalmatia (English: /ˈsuːlt/ SOOLT, French: [ʒɑ̃dədjø sult]; 29 March 1769 – 26 November 1851) was a French military commander and statesman. He was a Marshal of the Empire during the Napoleonic Wars, and served three times as President of the Council of Ministers (prime minister) of France. Soult is referred to as one of the outstanding military commanders of the modern era.

Son of a country notary from southern France, Soult enlisted in the French Royal Army in 1785 and quickly rose through the ranks during the French Revolution. He was promoted to brigade general after distinguishing himself at the Battle of Fleurus in 1794, and by 1799 he was a division general. He fought a drawn battle against equally numbered troops of Alexander Suvorov at Glarus in 1799 and in the same year notably defeated the Austrians under the lead of Friedrich von Hotze at the Linth River as Hotze died at the very beginning of battle leaving his Austrians without organization.

In 1804, Napoleon made Soult one of his first eighteen Marshals of the Empire. Soult played a key role in many of Napoleon's campaigns, most notably in the Ulm campaign (e.g., Battle of Memmingen) and at the Battle of Austerlitz, where his corps delivered the decisive attack that secured French victory. He was subsequently created Duke of Dalmatia. From 1808, he commanded French forces during the Peninsular War. At the Battle of Corunna, Soult clashed with the British under generals John Moore and John Hope; during Soult's attack, his troops were outflanked by numerically superior infantry and retreated to their original positions as did the British troops, but eventually the battlefield remained his due to the British retreat to their ships, thus Spain was left without British support for a while. At the Battle of Albuera, against superior Anglo-allied forces of general William Beresford, he again fought to a draw.

Despite several initial victories, for instance at the Battle of Ocaña, Soult was eventually outmaneuvered and driven out of Spain by the coalition forces under the command of Arthur Wellesley (later Duke of Wellington), which were superior to the army given to Soult in terms of the quality of troops and supplies. Soult then stubbornly fought Wellington at Toulouse in 1814, days after Napoleon's first abdication. Soult declared himself a royalist following the First Bourbon Restoration, but rejoined Napoleon during the Hundred Days. He was Napoleon's chief of staff during the Waterloo campaign in 1815, where the emperor suffered a final defeat; in this role Soult proved himself less capable than as a field commander.

Following the second restoration, Soult went into exile in Germany. In 1819 he was recalled to France and returned to royal favour, and in 1830 he was made Minister of War after the July Revolution. Soult oversaw reforms of the French military and was responsible for the creation of the French Foreign Legion. Under King Louis Philippe I, he was three times French prime minister from 1832 to 1834, almost a year between 1839 and 1840 and from 1840 to 1847. In 1847, he was awarded the title Marshal General of France. Soult again declared himself a Republican after Louis Philippe's overthrow in the French Revolution of 1848. He died in 1851. During his military career, Soult amassed a large collection of paintings, many during his time in Spain. The collection was dispersed in a sale following Soult's death.

== Early life ==
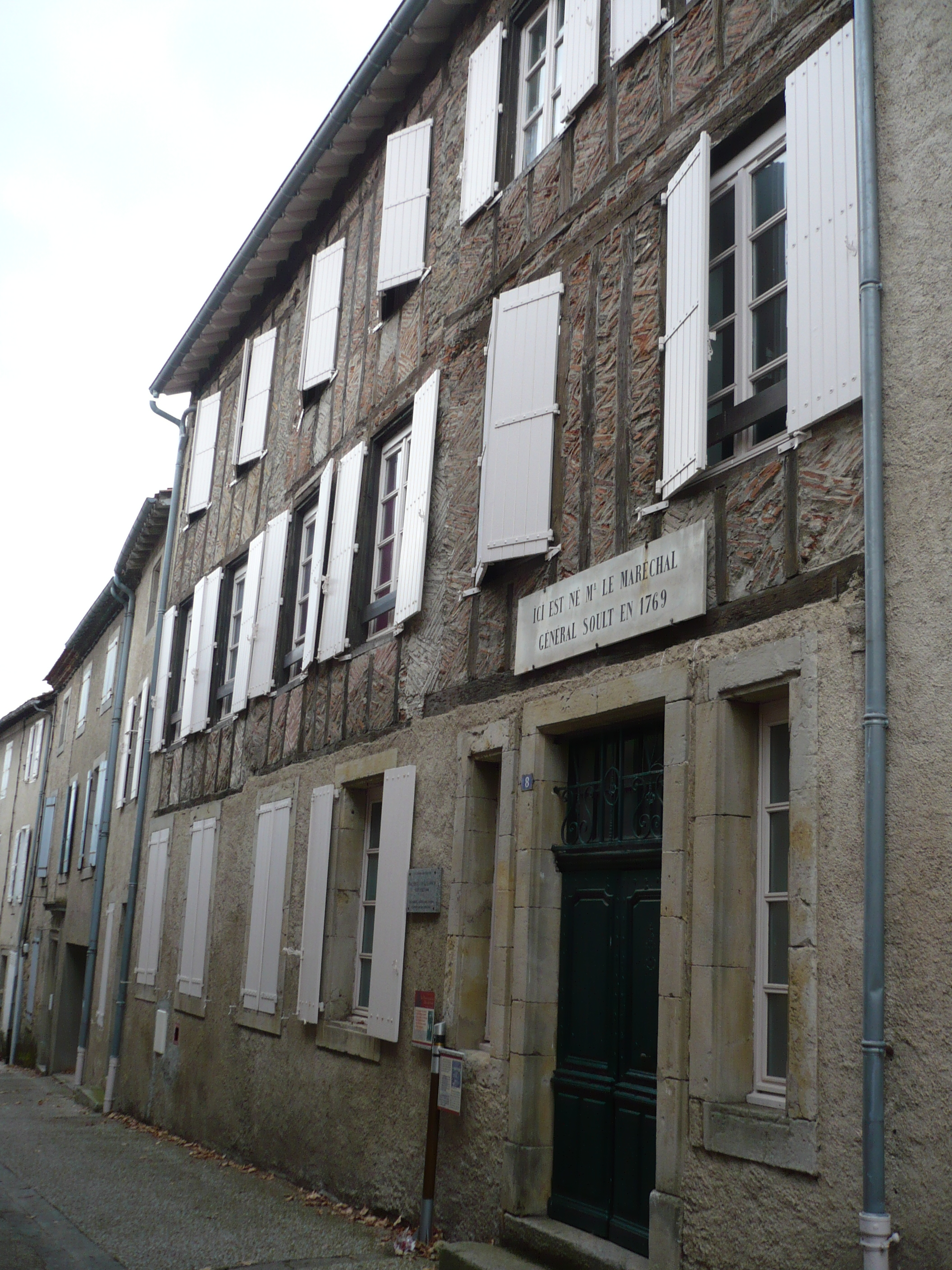
Soult's birthplace in Saint-Amans-Soult

Soult was born in Saint-Amans-la-Bastide (now called Saint-Amans-Soult in his honor, near Castres, in the Tarn department) and named after John of God. He was the son of a country notary named Jean Soult (1726–1779) by his marriage to Brigitte, daughter of Pierre François de Grenier de Lapierre. He was a Catholic.

Jean-de-Dieu Soult was expected to have a promising career as a lawyer. However, on 16 April 1785, at the age of sixteen, he enlisted as a private in the Royal-Infanterie regiment, to help his mother financially after the death of his father. His younger brother, Pierre-Benoît Soult, followed his example three years later, and would also become a French general.

== Revolutionary Wars ==
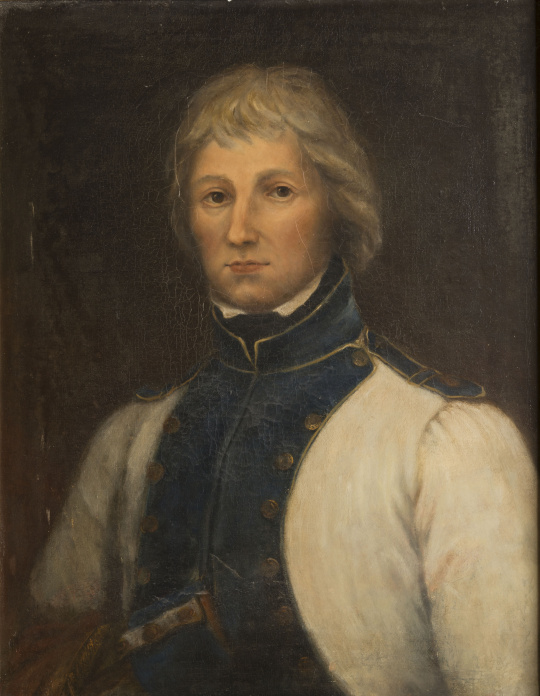
Soult as a sergeant of the 23rd Line Infantry Regiment in 1792, by Vincent Nicolas Raverat (1834)

Jean Soult fought in the wars of Revolutionary France. Soult's superior education ensured his promotion to the rank of sergeant after six years of service, and in July 1791 he became instructor to the first battalion of volunteers of the Bas-Rhin. On 17 January 1792 his colonel appointed him instructor in the 1st battalion of Haut-Rhin volunteers, with the rank of second lieutenant (sous-lieutenant). The war period, which began in April 1792, offered him many opportunities to stand out and he rose through the ranks with regularity. Adjutant-major on 16 July 1792, captain on 20 August 1793, provisional adjutant to the staff of General Lazare Hoche to the Army of the Moselle on 19 November 1793. He took part in the Battle of Kaiserslautern from 28 to 30 November, which allowed the recapture of Wissembourg and the relief of Landau. Hoche gives Soult the command of a detached body to take Marsthal's camp, a task which was brilliantly executed.

From 26 to 29 December he was present at the Second Battle of Wissembourg. He was appointed chief of staff of the avant-garde on 27 January 1794, provisional battalion commander on 7 February 1794, titular battalion commander on 3 April and adjutant-general brigade chief (adjudant-général chef de brigade) on 14 May. On 19 March 1794 the Army of the Moselle was replaced by the Army of the Rhine under the command of General Jean-Baptiste Jourdan. This army immediately returns to the campaign. Two battles were fought in Arlon on 17, 18 and 29 April, then on 21 May, in which Soult took an active part.

After the Battle of Fleurus of 1794, in which he distinguished himself for coolness, he joined the Army of Sambre and Meuse on 28 June. Soult was promoted to brigade general by the representatives on mission. For the next five years, Soult was employed in Germany under Generals Jean-Baptiste Jourdan (a veteran of the American War of Independence and a future Marshal), Jean Victor Marie Moreau, Jean-Baptiste Kléber and François Lefebvre (also a future Marshal). He took part in the Battle of Aldenhoven on 2 October 1794. He moved to Jacques Hatry's division and took part in the Siege of Luxembourg from 22 November to 7 June 1795. He took a brilliant part in the battles of Altenkirchen on 4 June 1796, of Friedberg on 10 July 1796, and in the Battle of Stockach against the army of Archduke Charles of Austria on 25 March 1799. The rank of division general was attributed to him on 4 April 1799, provisionally, and it is confirmed on the following 21 April.

Soult passed to the Army of Helvetia under the orders of General André Masséna (another future Marshal). It was at this time that he built the bases of his military reputation, in particular during the First Battle of Zurich of 2–5 June 1799; then he subdued the insurgent cantons, drove the rebels on the Reuss and drove them back to in the valley of Urseren — relieving Frauenfeld, Altikon, and Andelfingen. He obtained a citation on the order of the day of 2 June 1799. On the 10th of the same month, he hunted down, at the head of the 110th Demi-Brigade, the Austrians, occupying Mount Albis. Crossing the Linth River on 22 September, Soult led the enemy to suffer a loss of 4,000 men, then he came to meet the Russians who advanced on Kaltbrunn, forcing the surrender of a body of 2,000 men, seized Weesen and pushed the enemy back to Lake Constance. He won a significant victory at the battle of the Linth (25 to 26 September). Moreover, he had the honour of coordinating the actions of Gazan's and Molitor's divisions, which halted the advance of Suvorov's army at the battle of Näfels.

== Consulate Era ==
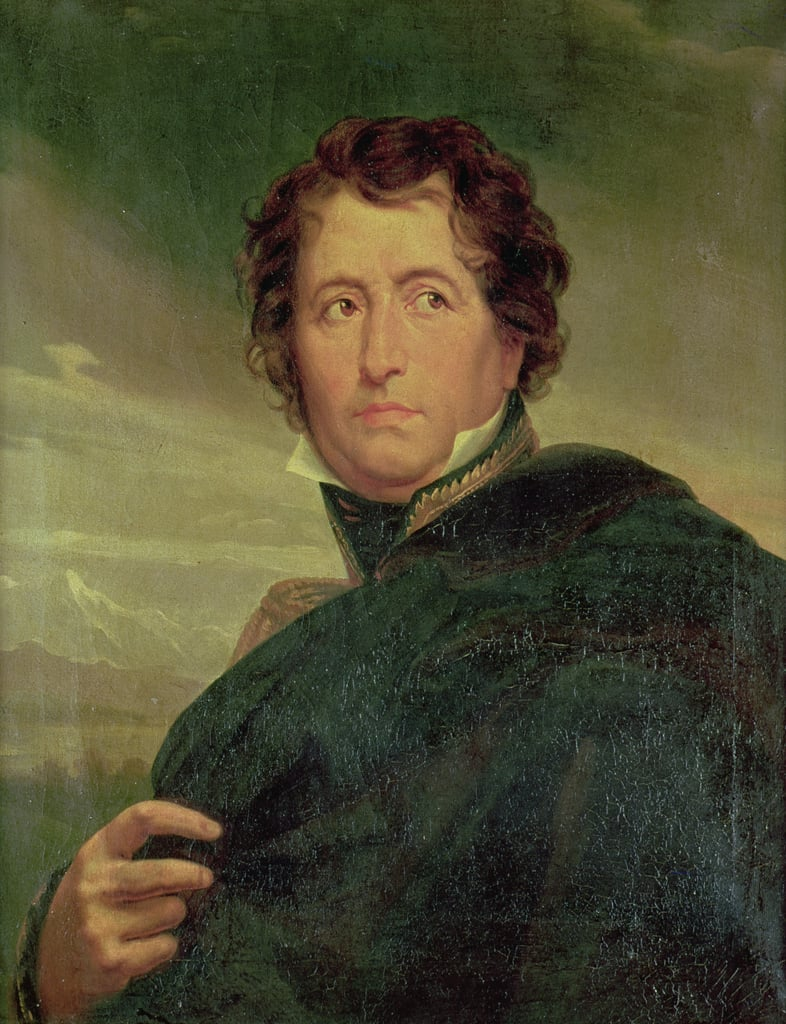
Anonymous portrait of Soult

When in 1800 the First Consul Napoleon Bonaparte entrusted Masséna to reorganize the Army of Italy, he insisted that Soult be his deputy; giving him the command of the right wing.

Soult distinguished himself for his active part in the defense of the country of Genoa. On 6 April, in an initial sortie, at the head of several battalions, he crossed the Austrian army and relieved General Gardanne. The enemy was repulsed beyond Piotta, and Soult pursued General Suvorov into the Alps, seizing Sassello and returning to Genoa with numerous prisoners, cannons, and flags. During another sortie, the general pushed in against the Austrian army, trapping a division at Monte-Facio. But, during a fight in Montecreto on 13 April 1800, a gunshot shattered his leg; lying on the battlefield wounded, he was robbed and taken prisoner, spending days in agony in a filthy hospital. This experience traumatized Soult, and he would never again place himself so forward in the battleline.

He was rescued after the victory at Marengo on 14 June 1800. Appointed military commander of Piedmont, then in the midst of a rebellion, Soult managed to put down the so-called Barbets insurrection. He even managed to discipline the rowdy hordes and use them for his service. Soult then received command of the southern part of the Kingdom of Naples.

Shortly before the Treaty of Amiens, General Soult returned to Paris, where the First Consul welcomed him with the highest distinction. On 5 March 1802 he was one of the four generals called to command the Consular Guard with the post of colonel general. He thereafter pledged allegiance to the new regime. In August 1803, Soult was entrusted with the command-in-chief of the Camp of Boulogne. Soult, a former drill instructor, imposed a rigorous discipline there, which ensured the effectiveness of French troops during future campaigns, and also earned him the nickname "Bras de Fer" ("Iron Arm"). Even Napoleon wondered if he was being too severe, to which assertions Soult replied:

"Those who can't handle what I myself endure will be left behind in the depots. Those that can will be fit to conquer the world."

== Napoleonic Wars ==
=== Marshal of the Empire ===
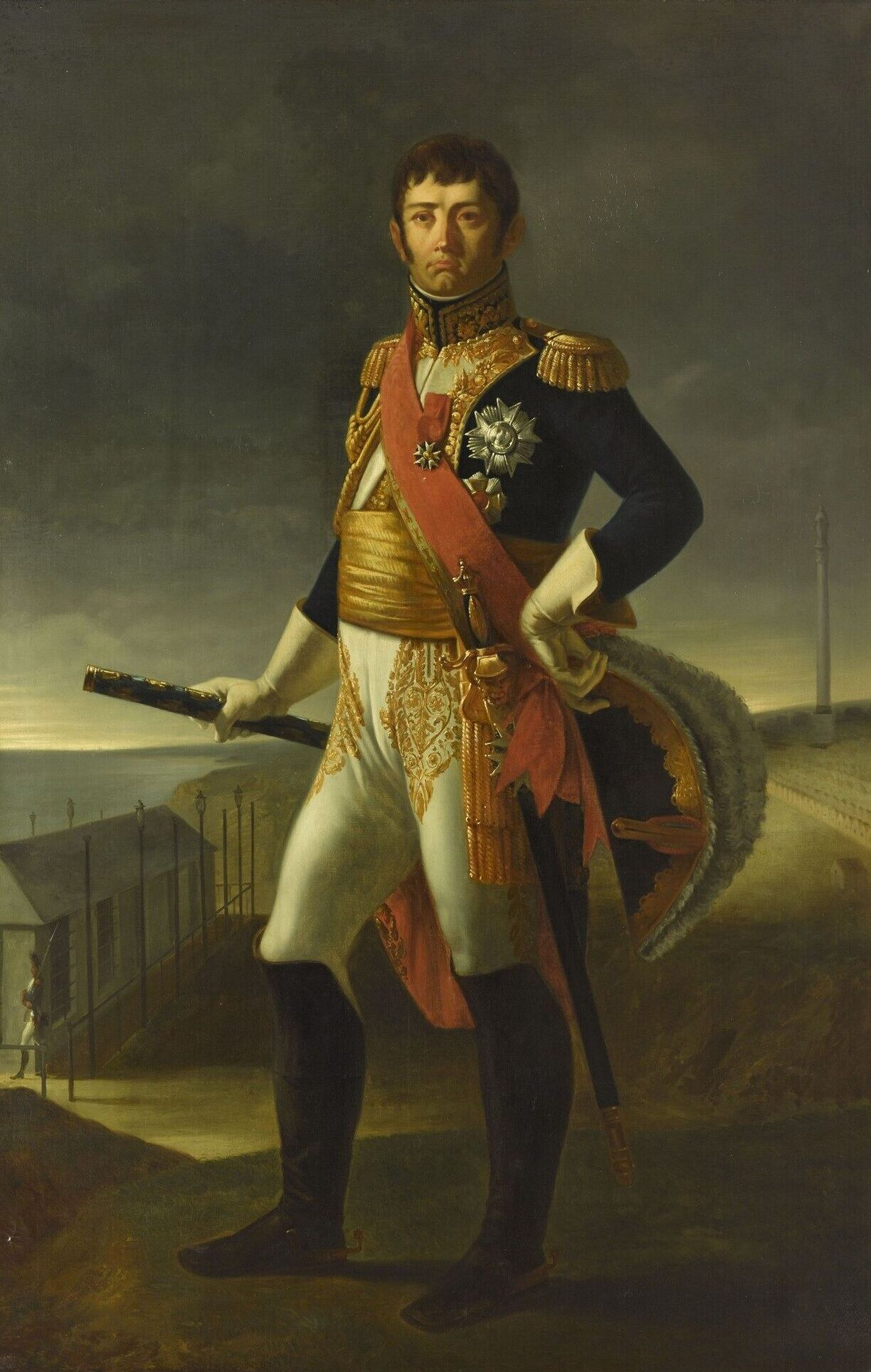
Soult as Marshal of the Empire. Copy of an 1805 portrait by Jean Broc

In May 1804, after Napoleon ascended to Emperor, Soult was made one of the first eighteen Marshals of the Empire. He commanded a corps in the advance on Ulm, and at Austerlitz he led the decisive attack on the Allied centre.

Soult's coat of arms as Duke of Dalmatia

Soult played a great part in many of the famous battles of the Grande Armée, including the Battle of Austerlitz in 1805 and the Battle of Jena in 1806. However, he was not present at the Battle of Friedland because on that same day he was capturing Königsberg. After the conclusion of the Treaties of Tilsit, he returned to France and in 1808 was anointed by Napoleon as 1st Duke of Dalmatia (French: Duc de Dalmatie). The awarding of this honour greatly displeased him, for he felt that his title should have been Duke of Austerlitz, a title which Napoleon had reserved for himself. In the following year, Soult was appointed as commander of the II Corps with which Napoleon intended to conquer Spain. After winning the Battle of Gamonal, Soult was detailed by the emperor to pursue Lieutenant-General Sir John Moore's British army. At the Battle of Coruña, in which Moore was killed, Soult failed to prevent British forces escaping by sea.

=== Peninsular War ===
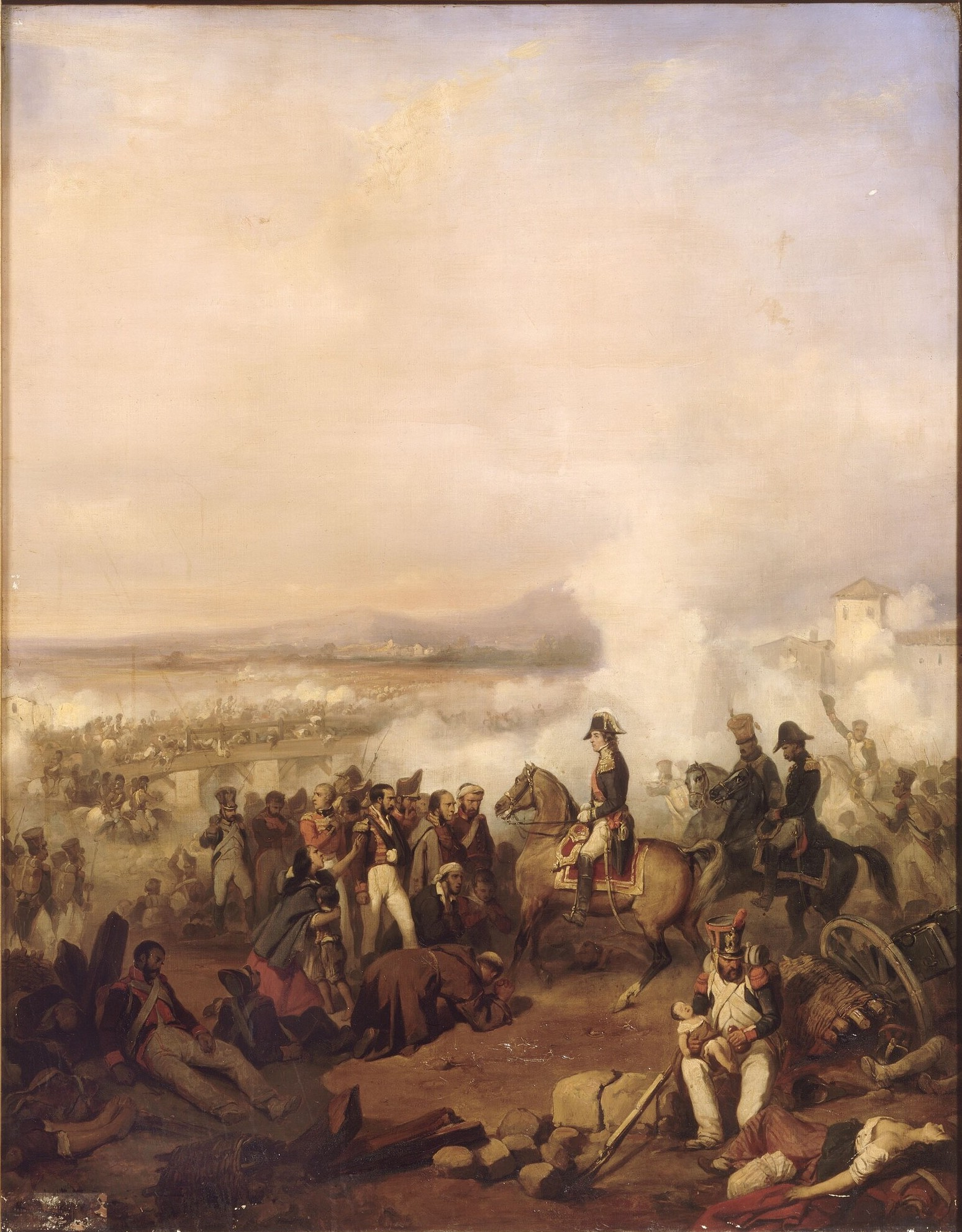
Soult at the First Battle of Porto, by Joseph Beaume

For the next four years, Soult remained in Spain engaged in the Peninsular War. In 1809, he invaded Portugal and took Porto, but was isolated by General Francisco da Silveira's strategy of contention. Busying himself with the political settlement of his conquests in French interests and, as he hoped, for his own ultimate benefit as a possible candidate for the Portuguese throne, he attracted the hatred of Republican officers in his army. Unable to move, he was eventually driven from Portugal in the Second Battle of Porto by Lieutenant-General Sir Arthur Wellesley (later the Duke of Wellington), making a painful and almost disastrous retreat over the mountains, pursued by General William Beresford and Silveira. After the Battle of Talavera, Soult was made chief of staff of French forces in Spain with extended powers, and on 19 November 1809, won a great victory at the Battle of Ocana.

In 1810, he invaded Andalusia, which he quickly overran. He stated, "Give me Seville and I will answer for Cádiz." However, because he then turned to seize Seville, the capture of Cádiz eluded him, this led to the prolonged and futile Siege of Cádiz, a strategic disaster for the French. In 1811, Soult marched north into Extremadura and took Badajoz. When the Anglo-Portuguese army laid siege to the city, he marched to its rescue, nearly winning the famous and bloody Battle of Albuera on 16 May.

In 1812, after Wellington's great victory at Salamanca, Soult was obliged to evacuate Andalusia. In the subsequent Siege of Burgos, he was able to drive Wellington's Anglo-allied army back to Salamanca. There, Soult failed to attack Wellington despite a superiority in numbers, and the British Army retired to the Portuguese frontier. Soon after, he was recalled from Spain at the request of Joseph Bonaparte (who had been installed by his brother as King of Spain) with whom, as with the other marshals, he had always disagreed. During his time in Spain, Soult gained an infamous reputation for looting art work by any means disposable, including force and threat of harm.

=== In Germany and defending southern France ===
In March 1813, Soult assumed command of the IV Corps of the Grande Armée and commanded the centre at Lützen and Bautzen, but he was soon sent, with unlimited powers, to the South of France to repair the damage done by the defeat at Vitoria. It is to Soult's credit that he was able to reorganise the demoralised French forces.

His last offensives into Spain were turned back by Wellington in the Battle of the Pyrenees (Sorauren) and by General Manuel Freire's Spaniards at San Marcial. Pursued onto French soil, Soult was maneuvered out of several positions at Nivelle, Nive, and Orthez, before suffering what was technically a defeat at Wellington's hands at the Battle of Toulouse. He nevertheless inflicted severe casualties on Wellington and was able to stop him from trapping the French forces.

=== Hundred Days and Waterloo ===
After Napoleon's first abdication in 1814, Soult declared himself a royalist, received the Order of Saint Louis, and acted as Minister of War from 26 November 1814 to 11 March 1815. When Napoleon returned from Elba, Soult at once declared himself a Bonapartist, was made a Peer of France, and acted as chief of staff to the emperor during the Waterloo campaign, in which role he distinguished himself far less than he had done as commander of an over-matched army.

In his book, Waterloo: The History of Four Days, Three Armies and Three Battles, Bernard Cornwell summarizes the opinions of several historians that Soult's presence in the Army of the North was one of several factors contributing to Napoleon's defeat, because of the animosity between him and Marshal Michel Ney, the other senior commander, and because, in spite of his experience as a soldier, Soult lacked his predecessor Marshal Louis-Alexandre Berthier's administrative skills. The most glaring instance of this was his written order, according to Napoleon's instructions, to Marshal Emmanuel de Grouchy to position his force on the Anglo-allied army's left flank in order to prevent reinforcement by the Prussians. Cornwell decries the wording of Soult's order as "almost impenetrable nonsense", and Grouchy misinterpreted the order, instead marching against the Prussian rearguard at Wavre.

== Political career ==
Following the Second Bourbon Restoration in 1815, Soult went into exile in Germany, but in 1819 he was recalled and in 1820 again made a Marshal of France. He once more tried to show himself as a fervent royalist and was made a peer in 1827. After the revolution of 1830 he declared himself a partisan of King Louis Philippe I, who welcomed his support and revived for him the title of Marshal General of France, previously held only by Turenne, Claude Louis Hector de Villars, and Maurice de Saxe.

=== Creation of the French Foreign Legion ===
As Minister of War (1830 to 1834), Soult organized and oversaw the rearmament of the French military. The strength of the Army of the Restoration numbered only a little over 200,000 men and Soult sought to double its size, carrying the necessary reforms from 1831 to 1832. The first law of this important military reform was that creating the Foreign Legion, on 9 March 1831; a force of foreign volunteers which could only be used outside the territory of metropolitan France, especially aimed at garrisoning the recently conquered Algiers. The Legion, when created, was loathed by the army and considered a lower posting; the force being colloquially called as the "Bastard of Soult".

=== Military reforms ===
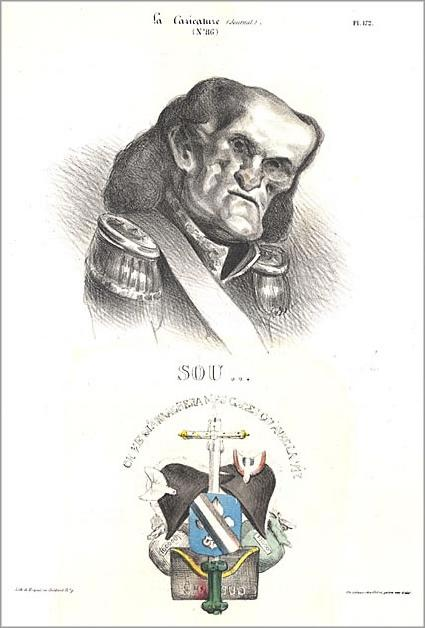
Caricature of the Duke of Dalmatia by Honoré Daumier, 1832

Louis-Philippe, worried about having to rely solely on the National Guard to maintain public order, instructed Marshal Soult to reorganize the line army without delay. Soult wrote a report to the king, presented to the Chamber of Deputies on 20 February 1831, in which he criticized the recruitment Gouvion-Saint-Cyr law of 1818: the voluntary system combined with the drawing of ballots and the possibility of being replaced had not made it possible to increase the number of manpower sufficiently, and that the promotion procedures helped to maintain over-staffing. Soult proposed the main lines of a military policy aimed at increasing the army's strength, reducing said over-staffing and ensuring the supply of arms and ammunition.

Following the creation of the Legion on 9 March, Soult passed the laws of 11 April 1831 on military pensions, of 21 March and 14 April 1832, on army recruitment and promotion, and of 19 May 1834 on the status of officers. Soult also oversaw the construction of the fortifications of Paris. In 1831, he was sent by Louis-Philippe to Lyon with 20,000 men to crush the first insurrection of the city's silk workers, the canuts. Order is restored, but Soult becomes very unpopular within the Republican camp. In his play Napoléon Bonaparte ou Trente ans de l'histoire de France (Napoleon Bonaparte or Thirty Years of the History of France), Dumas Père represents him in a dreadful appearance during the Hundred Days.

In 1834, when a new insurrection broke out in April in Lyon, Marshal Soult received from Lieutenant-General Aymar, commander of the troops in the city, a desperate telegraphic dispatch about evacuating the city. The Duke of Dalmatia's firm response was not long in coming, chastising the general and ordering him to hold all his positions and to man the walls and be buried beneath them.

=== Prime minister ===
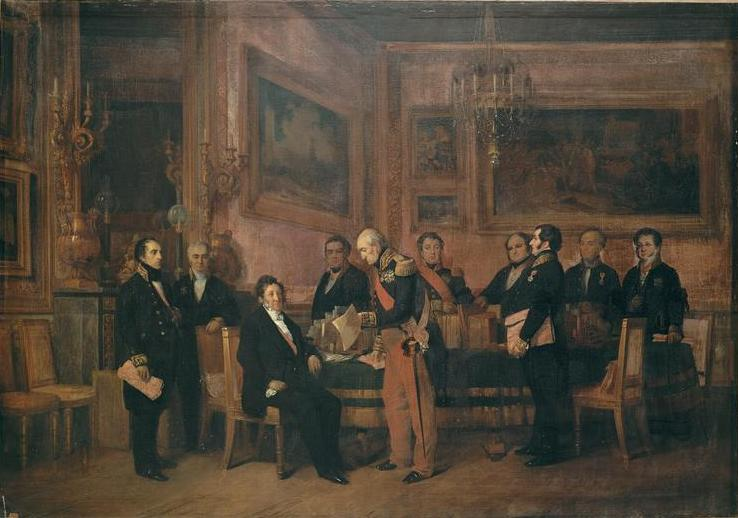
The Soult cabinet in 1842, with François Guizot (first from left), King Louis Philippe (seated) and Prime Minister Soult (middle), by Claudius Jacquand (1844)

While he was minister of war, he held the presidency of the Council of Ministers (or Prime Minister) for the first time in 1832–1834. France being the guarantor of the Treaty of the XXIV articles, he had the Antwerp expedition carried out by Marshal Gérard, who seized the city after heroic resistance from the Dutch (December 1832) and returned it to Belgium, its country of attribution.

In April 1838, Louis-Philippe chose Soult to represent him at the coronation of Queen Victoria. He received a triumphant welcome in London – where his former enemy, the Duke of Wellington, reputedly caught him by the arm and exclaimed "I have you at last!"

Once again at the head of the government (1839–1840), he was at the same time the holder of the Foreign Affairs portfolio. He participated in the ceremonies for returning the ashes of Napoleon in December 1840.

President of the Council for almost seven years, from 1840 to 1847, he left the effective management of the Cabinet to his minister of foreign affairs, François Guizot, who logically succeeded him when he left the government, for health reasons. For five years (1840–1845), he combined his function with that of minister of war. On 26 September 1847 Louis-Philippe restored for him the honorary dignity of Marshal General of the king's camps and armies, however modifying this title into the unique Marshal General of France.

During his term as Prime Minister and Minister for War he attempted to cover up the indiscriminate killings of Algerian civilians who died of suffocation following French troops lighting fires at the entrances to caves in which they had fled, the story nonetheless leaked to the press.

After the French Revolution of 1848, Soult declared himself a republican.

== Death and Estate Sale ==
Soult died in 1851 in his castle in Soult-Berg, near Saint-Amans-la-Bastide where he was born, a few days before the coup of 1851. In his honor, the town was renamed Saint-Amans-Soult in December 1851.

After his death, an estate sale was organized to sell the contents of the castle in 1852. Of the more than 180 paintings that Soult looted during his military career, 115 were auctioned off and of these 109 were from Spain which were sold for a total of 1.342.146 francs. Five of those paintings were from Murillo, including The Birth of the Virgin, Rest on the Flight into Egypt and Liberation of Saint Peter, with other paintings from Luis de Morales, Zurbarán and Herrera the Younger. Famously, Soult also looted another painting by Murillo, Saint Elizabeth of Hungary Curing the Sick, but gave it to the Museé Napoleon (Louvre) after arriving from his military campaign. When news spread of his estate sale, criticism for Soult's methods while looting in Spain were renewed in french publications which brough great attention from art collectors from across Europe who rushed to bid for the auction items.

The painting La Virgen y el Niño en la Gloria by Murillo, also looted and cut in two by Soult from Seville, was bought for 5,000 pounds in 1953 by the british National Art-Collection Fund and presented to the Walker Art Gallery, Liverpool. One of the pieces was originally bought by Samuel Jones-Loyd, in 1838, and the last piece was acquired in 1862 and finally reunited.

== Works ==
Soult published a memoir justifying his adherence to Napoleon during the Hundred Days, and his notes and journals were arranged by his son Napoleon Hector, who published the first part Mémoires du maréchal-général Soult (Memories of Marshal-General Soult) in 1854. Le Noble's Mémoires sur les operations des Français en Galicie (Memories of the Operations of the French in Galicia) are supposed to have been written from Soult's papers.

== Military capability ==
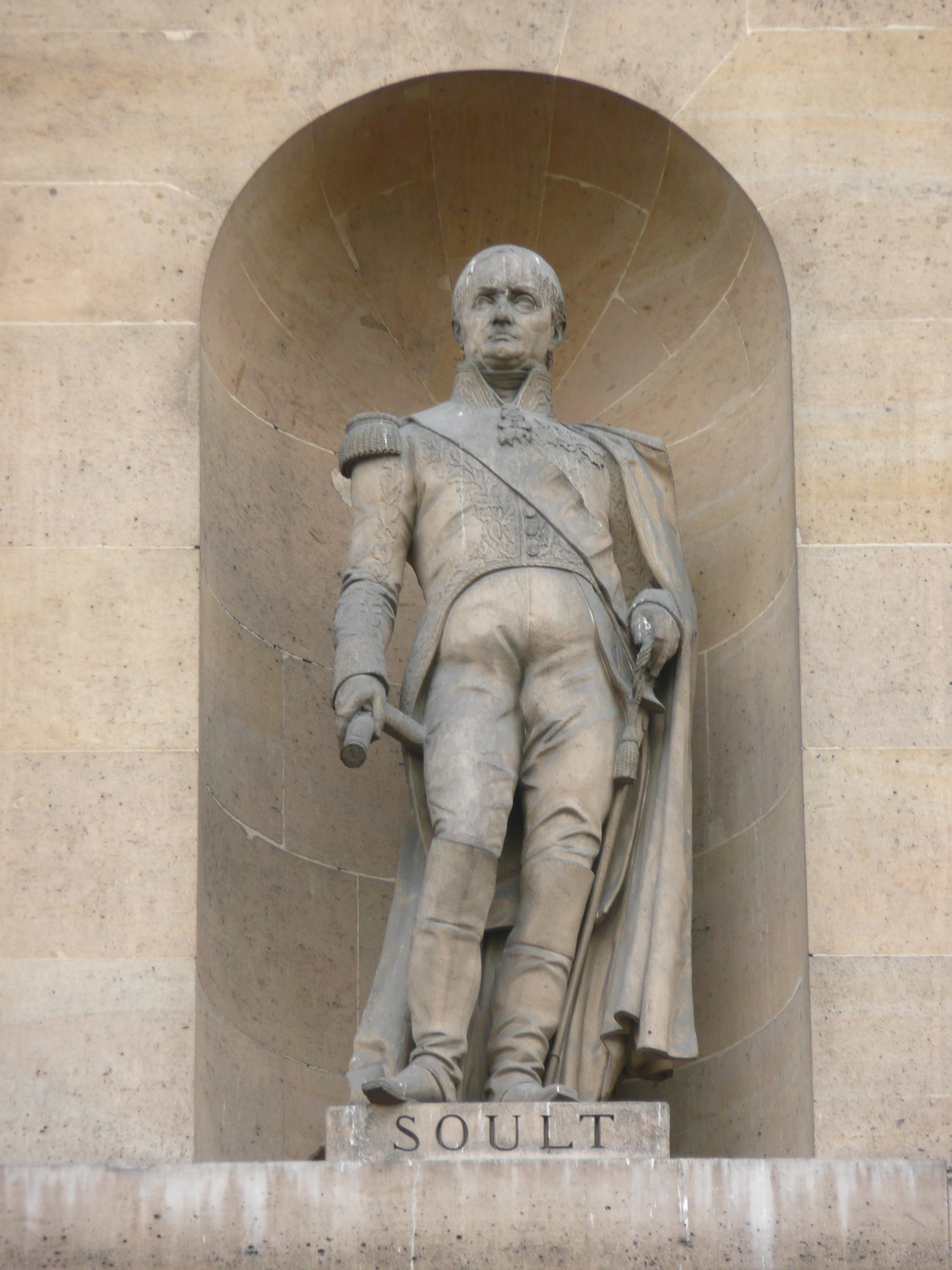
Statue of Soult at the Louvre

Although often found wanting tactically – even some of his own aides questioned his inability to amend a plan to take into account altered circumstances on the battlefield – Soult's performance in the closing months of the Peninsular War is often regarded as proof of his fine talents as a general. Repeatedly defeated in these campaigns by the Allies under Wellington, it was the case that many of his soldiers were raw conscripts while the Allies could count greater numbers of veterans among their ranks. Soult was a skillful military strategist. An example was his drive to cut off Wellington's British army from Portugal after Talavera, which nearly succeeded. Though repeatedly defeated by Wellington in 1813–1814, he conducted a clever defence against him.

Soult's armies were usually well readied before going into battle. After Vitoria, he reorganized the demoralized French forces of Joseph Bonaparte into a formidable army in a remarkably short time. An exception to this good logistical record was launching the Battle of the Pyrenees offensive when his soldiers only had four days' rations. Tactically, Soult planned his battles well, but often left too much to his subordinates. Wellington said that "Soult never seemed to know how to handle troops after a battle had begun". An example of this was at the Battle of Albuera, where he brilliantly turned Beresford's flank to open the battle, yet when he found himself facing unexpected opposition from British and Spanish troops, he allowed his generals to adopt a clumsy attack formation and was beaten. Another example of his strengths and weaknesses can be seen at the Battle of the Nive. Soult recognized Wellington's strategic dilemma and took advantage by launching surprise attacks on both wings of the Anglo-Allied Army. But French tactical execution was poor and the British general managed to fend off Soult's blows. Sloppy staff work marred his tenure as Napoleon's chief of staff in the Waterloo campaign.

In the early twentieth century the British named the Royal Navy monitor HMS Marshal Soult after him.

== Marriage and children ==
On 26 April 1796, Soult married Johanna Louise Elisabeth Berg (1771–1852), the daughter of Johann Abraham Berg (1730–1786) by his marriage to Wilhelmine Mumm in Solingen. She died at the Château de Soult-Berg on 22 March 1852. The couple had three children:

- Napoléon (1802–1857), 2nd Duke of Dalmatia, who died without male heir, at which time the title became extinct
- Hortense (1804–1862)
- Caroline (1817–1817)

== Sources ==
- Glover, Michael. The Peninsular War 1807–1814. London: Penguin, 2001. ISBN 0-14-139041-7
- Chandler, David (ed.). Griffith, Paddy. Napoleon's Marshals, "Soult: King Nicolas." New York: Macmillan, 1987. ISBN 0-02-905930-5
- That article, in turn, references:
  - A. Salle, Vie politique du maréchal Soult (Paris, 1834)
  - A. de Grozelier, Le Maréchal Soult (Castres, 1851)
  - A. Combes, Histoire anecdotique du maréchal Soult (Castres, 1869).

Political offices
Preceded by Casimir Pierre Perier	Prime Minister of France; 11 October 1832 – 18 July 1834	Succeeded by Comte Gérard
Preceded by Comte Molé	Prime Minister of France; 12 May 1839 – 1 March 1840	Succeeded by Adolphe Thiers
Preceded by Adolphe Thiers	Prime Minister of France; 29 October 1840 – 19 September 1847	Succeeded by François Guizot
Preceded by Pierre-Antoine, comte Dupont de l'Étang	French minister of War; 26 November 1814 – 11 March 1815	Succeeded by Henri Clarke, Duke of Feltre
Preceded by Étienne Maurice Gérard	French minister of War; 17 November 1830 – 18 July 1834	Succeeded by Étienne Maurice Gérard
Preceded by Amédée Louis Despans-Cubières	French minister of War; 29 October 1840 – 10 November 1845	Succeeded by Alexandre Pierre Chevalier Moline de Saint-Yon
French nobility
Preceded by Title created	Duke of Dalmatia; 1808–1851	Succeeded by Napoléon-Hector Soult
