= Battle of Arlon (1794) =

Battle of the War of the First Coalition

Coordinates: 49°40′56.65″N 5°48′41.13″E

- Part of the War of the First Coalition
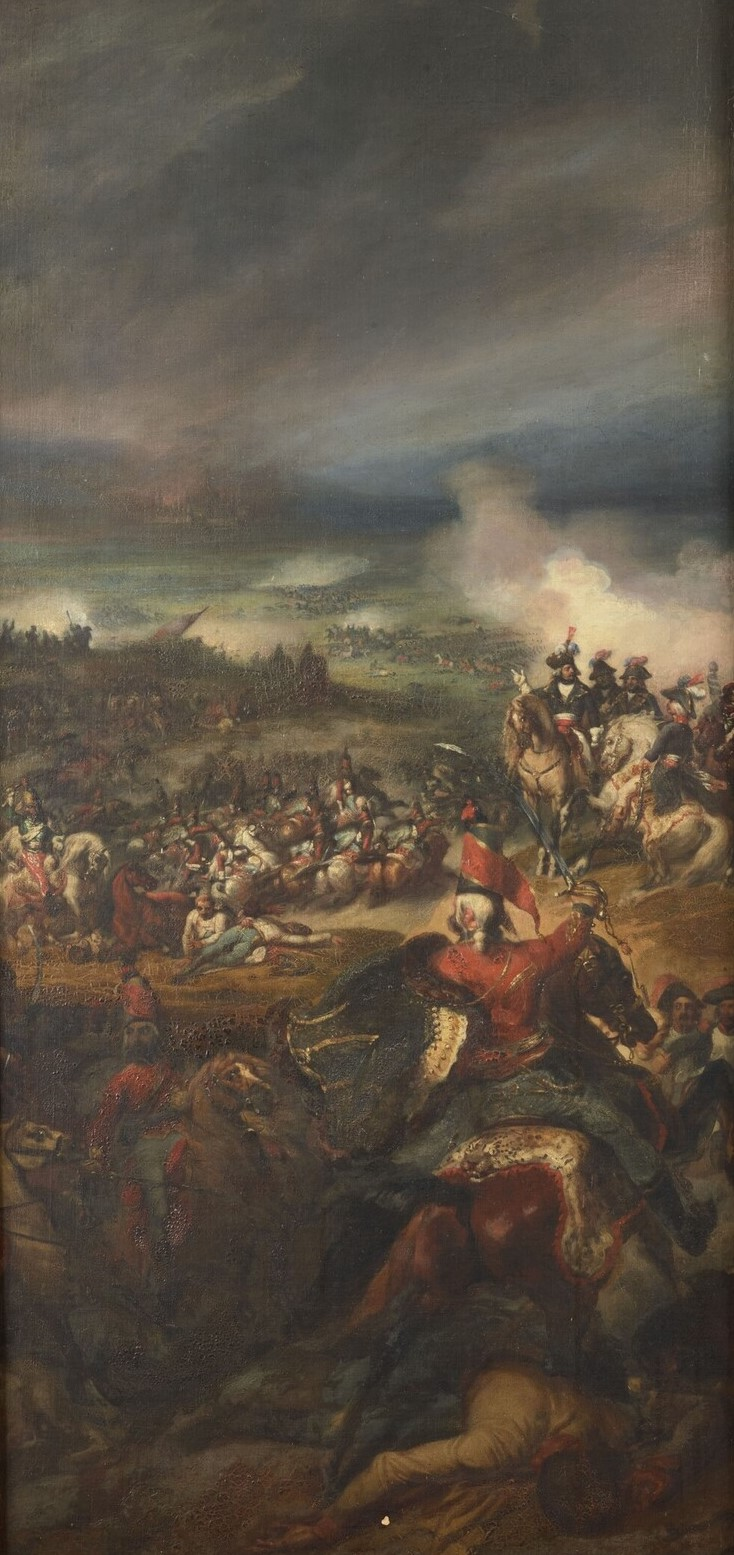
- Combat of Arlon, 17 April 1794 by Auguste-Alexandre d'Espinassy, 1836-1837
Date	17 and 18 April 1794
Location	Arlon
Result	French victory

Belligerents
(France) French Republic	(Habsburg monarchy) Habsburg Monarchy

Commanders and leaders
Jean-Baptiste Jourdan	Johann von Beaulieu

Strength
20,000	16,000

In 1794 the Battle of Arlon covers two separate episodes of the French Revolutionary Wars, one in April and the other in May, both at the stronghold of Arlon (also fought over at the First Battle of Arlon the previous year). Both engagements pitched the French general Jean-Baptiste Jourdan against the Austrian general Johann von Beaulieu.

== 17, 18 and 29 April ==
General Jourdan arrived in Metz on 19 March 1794 to take command of the Army of the Moselle in place of Hoche. The first orders he received from the Committee of Public Safety were to take 20,000 men in front of Longwy as far as Bouillon to intercept enemy movements from Namur and Liège towards Luxembourg, and at the same time to detach 20,000 others under general Hatry to make an incursion into Luxembourg and take Arlon.

On 17 April he presented himself before this position, whilst his right (linked to a division of the Army of the Rhine) attacked the Austrians at Merzig near Trier. The heights of Arlon were defended by 16,000 Austrian soldiers under Beaulieu. This general's vanguard was forced to retire at the bridge in Aubange by Lefebvre who, ignoring his orders and pursuing the enemy as far as the heights of Bubange, suddenly found himself in front of Beaulieu's forces that stopped his advance. Jourdan was forced to demote Lefebvre so as not to leave him exposed to a bombardment that would be as murderous as it would be useless, and the affair was postponed until the following day.

On 18 April Lefebvre, Morlot and Hatry made a frontal assault on the Austrian redoubts, but at the moment they had formed up for a bayonet charge, the division under Championnet, which had turned the enemy left in taking the heights of Toernich, threw the Austrian ranks into such disorder that they fled on the road to Luxembourg. Many were killed by the light artillery under general Debelle, whose batteries had followed Championnet's movement. On this occasion Championnet was made chef de brigade (colonel). The left of the Army of the Moselle set up base in Arlon, but Beaulieu returned in force on 29 April and surprised Hatry and Championnet who, at their turn, had to retreat in disorder to Aubange and Longwy.

During these days these positions were the theatre of bloody fights that had no decisive result for either side, which both returned to their original positions afterward.

== 21 May ==
The following month saw more fighting at the same location. Jourdan received orders to bring assistance to the Army of the Ardennes and the Army of the North, then having difficulties around Charleroi. He set off on 21 May 1794 with 45,000 men and camped around Arlon. Unaware of the extent of this advance, Beaulieu rashly advanced on Bouillon on 17 May. Faced with Jourdan's advance, he then retired to a defensive position at Ardoy, across the river Meuse from Namur, via Dinant. However, Jourdan was able to attack and rout detachments of his rearguard at Dinant on 29 May.

== Bibliography ==
- Général de Jomini: Histoire critique et militaire des campagnes de la Révolution (1811);
- A. Hugo: Histoire des armées françaises de 1792 à 1837 (1838);
- P. Giguet: Histoire militaire de la France (1849);
- C. Clerget: Tableaux des armées françaises pendant les guerres de la Révolution (1905).
