= Bousse, Moselle =

Bousse
- Commune
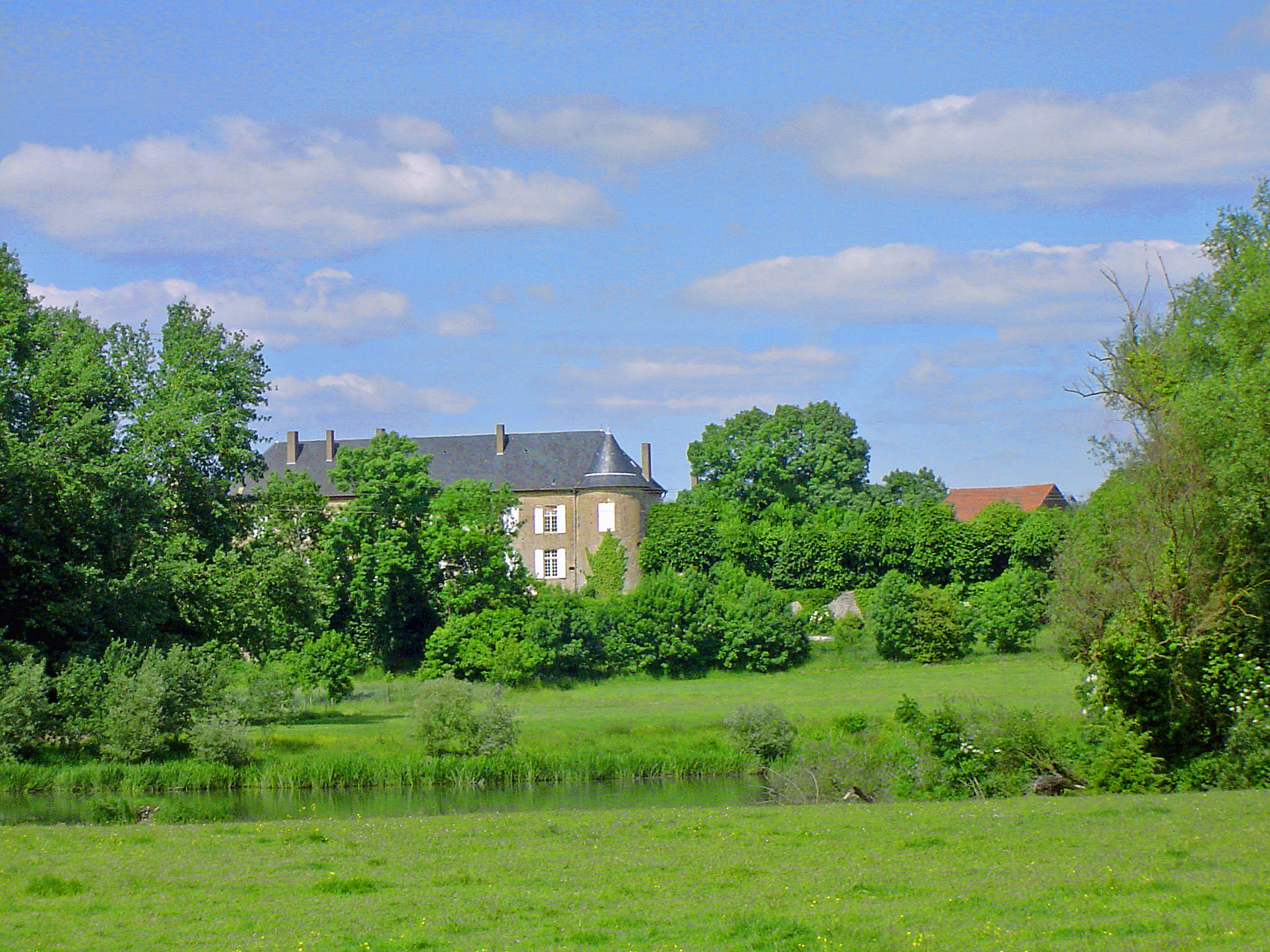
- The chateau in Bousse

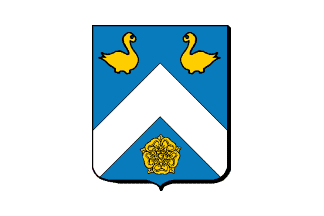
- Flag Coat of arms
- Location of Bousse
- Location within France Location within Grand Est
- Coordinates: 49°16′37″N 6°11′46″E
- Country: France
- Region: Grand Est
- Department: Moselle
- Arrondissement: Thionville
- Canton: Metzervisse
- Intercommunality: Arc mosellan

Government
  - Mayor (2020–2026): Pierre Kowalczyk
- Area^{1}: 8.81 km^{2} (3.40 sq mi)
- Highest elevation: 234 m (768 ft)
- Lowest elevation: 150 m (490 ft)
- Population (2023): 3,236
  - Density: 367/km^{2} (951/sq mi)
- Time zone: UTC+01:00 (CET)
  - Summer (DST): UTC+02:00 (CEST)
- INSEE/Postal code: 57102 /57310
- ^{1} French Land Register data, which excludes lakes, ponds, glaciers > 1 km^{2} (0.386 sq mi or 247 acres) and river estuaries.

Bousse (French pronunciation: [bus]; Lorraine Franconian: Buuss; German: Buß) is a commune in the Moselle department in Grand Est in northeastern France.

== Population ==
Historical population
| Year | Pop. | ±% p.a. |
|---|---|---|
| 1968 | 1,387 | — |
| 1975 | 2,079 | +5.95% |
| 1982 | 2,576 | +3.11% |
| 1990 | 2,575 | −0.00% |
| 1999 | 2,333 | −1.09% |
| 2007 | 2,718 | +1.93% |
| 2012 | 2,989 | +1.92% |
| 2017 | 3,174 | +1.21% |
| 2023 | 3,236 | +0.32% |
Source: INSEE

== See also ==
- Communes of the Moselle department
