= Nicolas Léonard Beker =

French military officer (1770–1840)

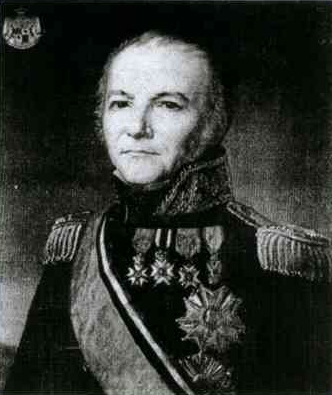
- Nicolas Léonard Beker
- Born: 18 January 1770; Obernai, Bas-Rhin, France
- Died: 18 November 1840 (aged 70) Aubiat, Puy-de-Dôme, France
- Allegiance: France
- Branch: Cavalry
- Rank: General of Division
- Conflicts: French Revolutionary Wars; Napoleonic Wars
- Awards: Légion d'Honneur, GC; Military Order of Max Joseph
- Other work: Count of the Empire

Nicolas Léonard Beker (also Becker or Bagert by last name; born 18 January 1770 – died 18 November 1840) joined the French army as a dragoon before the French Revolutionary Wars and rose in rank to become a general officer. In 1800 he married the sister of Louis Desaix, who was killed at the Battle of Marengo. He led an infantry brigade in the 1805 campaign and commanded a dragoon division in 1806 and 1807. In 1809 he became chief of staff to Marshal André Masséna but ran afoul of Emperor Napoleon and was banished from the army for several years.

After Napoleon's defeat at the Battle of Waterloo and the collapse of his regime, the interim French government appointed Beker to guard the ex-emperor. The general behaved correctly during the intrigues surrounding Napoleon before he went into exile at Saint Helena. Nevertheless, he was summarily retired during the Bourbon Restoration and only received the honors due him many years later. Beker is one of the names inscribed under the Arc de Triomphe.

== Early career ==
Born on 18 January 1770 at Obernai in the French province of Alsace, Beker was serving as a dragoon in the royal army at the beginning of the French Revolution. During the War of the First Coalition he earned rapid promotion to adjutant general. After fighting as a dragoon, chasseur, and hussar, he commanded a brigade in 1795 and served as chief of staff in the Army of Sambre-et-Meuse. He served in the Rhine Campaign of 1796. As a staff officer he was present at an unusual event during the Battle of Limburg. On the night of 16 September 1796 he notified the commander of the right flank division, Jean Castelbert de Castelverd that the Austrians had won a crossing of the Lahn River at Diez but that French forces had sealed off the bridgehead. At this, the division commander panicked and ordered an immediate retreat despite positive orders to hold the river line. This opened a gaping hole in the French lines and led to a general retreat. When later asked privately about his actions, Castelverd fumed that the rest of the army was looking for an excuse to withdraw. Castelverd was later removed from command for his failure.

Beker was an adjutant general on the staff of Jean-Mathieu-Philibert Sérurier at the Battle of Magnano in 1799. Soon after Marengo, Beker married the deceased Desaix's older sister Antoinette Desaix (1764–1816). He was elevated to the rank of general of brigade on 2 January 1801. He fought with the Army of Santo Domingo in 1802.

== Empire ==
During the War of the Third Coalition, Beker commanded an infantry brigade in Louis Gabriel Suchet's division in Marshal Jean Lannes' V Corps. He led his command at the Battle of Austerlitz on 2 December 1805. On 24 December he won a promotion to general of division for his exploits.

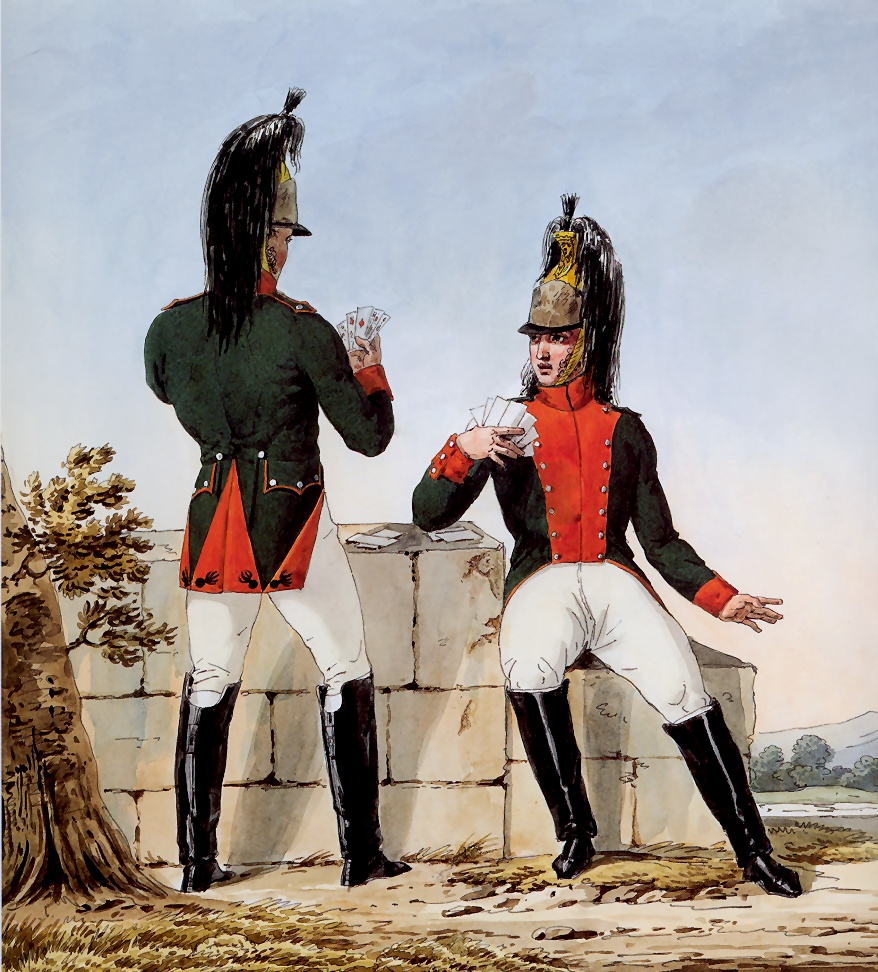
25th Dragoon Regiment

At the start of the War of the Fourth Coalition Beker did not have a command. However, he served as acting commander of the 2nd Dragoon Division when Emmanuel Grouchy was ill. In the operations shortly after the Battle of Prenzlau on 28 October 1806, he led a brigade of dragoons in the search for isolated Prussian columns. At Anklam on 31 October he located the combined forces of Karl Anton Ernst von Bila and his younger brother Rudolph Ernst Christoph von Bila. Attacking, he forced the Prussian column to retreat to the north side of the Peene River. The next morning, he secured the surrender of 1,100 infantry, 1,073 cavalry, and six colors.

During the winter campaign in Poland, Beker commanded a small dragoon division numbering 1,200 men. With this unit he fought at the Battle of Pultusk on 26 December 1806. During Lannes' mid-morning attack, Beker's dragoons covered the left flank under the immediate orders of Suchet. One source listed Beker as commander of the 2nd Dragoon Division at Pultusk. His independent command later became known as the 5th Dragoon Division and served first under Anne Jean Marie René Savary and later under Marshal André Masséna near Warsaw. The 15th, 22nd, and 25th Dragoon Regiments fought at the Battle of Ostroleka on 16 February 1807. Napoleon appointed him a Count of the Empire in 1808 with the title Count of Mons.

Beker served as Masséna's chief of staff from the beginning of the War of the Fifth Coalition through the Battle of Aspern-Essling. He was considered a capable chief of staff. Historian Francis Loraine Petre wrote that Masséna had grown lazy and delegated too many responsibilities to Beker, "probably also a great deal of the framing of orders". Masséna never once in the 1809 campaign signed a general order to his corps. Petre noted that the orders for the morning of 21 April 1809 were issued, "over Becker's signature as usual". According to Petre, Napoleon took notice of the marshal's habit of letting Beker run the corps for him and removed the chief of staff from his post, "probably unjustly". James R. Arnold related that the emperor sacked Beker after he heard that the chief of staff criticized his strategy. Masséna defended his intelligent chief of staff, but Napoleon had his way. Henri Lachouque claimed that the emperor dismissed Beker after he "violently criticized" Napoleon's orders. The unlucky general was put on half-pay and retired in 1811. Another account has him banished to the remote outpost of Belle-Île off the west coast of France. Beker's replacement as Masséna's chief of staff was François Nicolas Fririon.

== Hundred Days ==
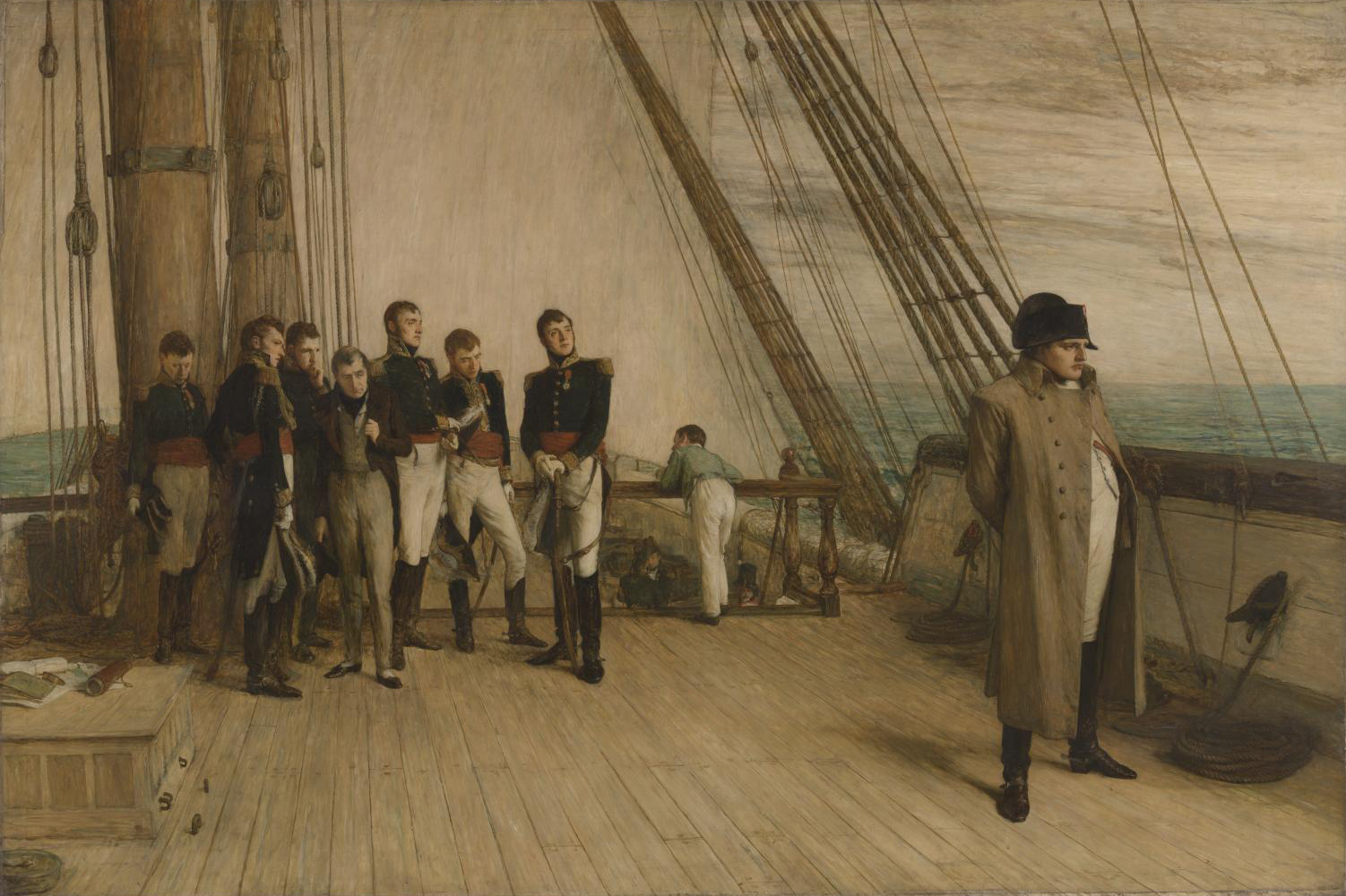
Napoleon on Board the Bellerophon by William Quiller Orchardson, 1880

King Louis XVIII restored Beker to service on 3 June 1814. Described as "stubborn and hard-headed", he ran for office and was elected as the representative from Puy-de-Dôme on 8 May 1815. This was during the Hundred Days when Napoleon returned and the king fled. Within weeks, Napoleon was decisively defeated at the Battle of Waterloo and on 20 June Beker was ordered to report to Paul Grenier and assist in the defense of Paris.

At the orders of Marshal Louis-Nicolas Davout, Beker was sent to the Château de Malmaison purportedly "to ensure the Emperor's safety". Actually, Joseph Fouché, who controlled the interim government, feared that Napoleon might rejoin the French army and continue the war. Fouché and Davout knew there was every reason for Beker to dislike Napoleon and found him the perfect person to keep a close guard on the abdicated emperor. Beker tried to avoid the unpleasant task, but his duty as a soldier overcame his disgust at the intrigues going on in Paris at the time.

Napoleon hoped to flee to the United States from the port of Rochefort, while Fouché wished to hand the ex-emperor over to the Allies. Beker accompanied his former sovereign until 15 July, when Napoleon surrendered his person to the captain of a British man-of-war at the Île-d'Aix. After the event, Louis XVIII's war minister Marshal Laurent Gouvion Saint-Cyr peremptorily ordered Beker to go home and remain there. He was not reinstated in rank until 1818. He belatedly received the Order of Saint Louis in 1825 and the Grand Cordon of the Légion d'Honneur in 1831.

Beker died at Aubiat, Puy-de-Dôme on 18 November 1840. His name is engraved on Column 26 of the Arc de Triomphe. His only son Napoleon Beker became a staff officer in the French royal army. After his son died on 21 April 1829, Beker adopted his sister's son Victor-Felix Martha Beker as the heir to the title Count of Mons.
