= Army of Sambre and Meuse =

French field army

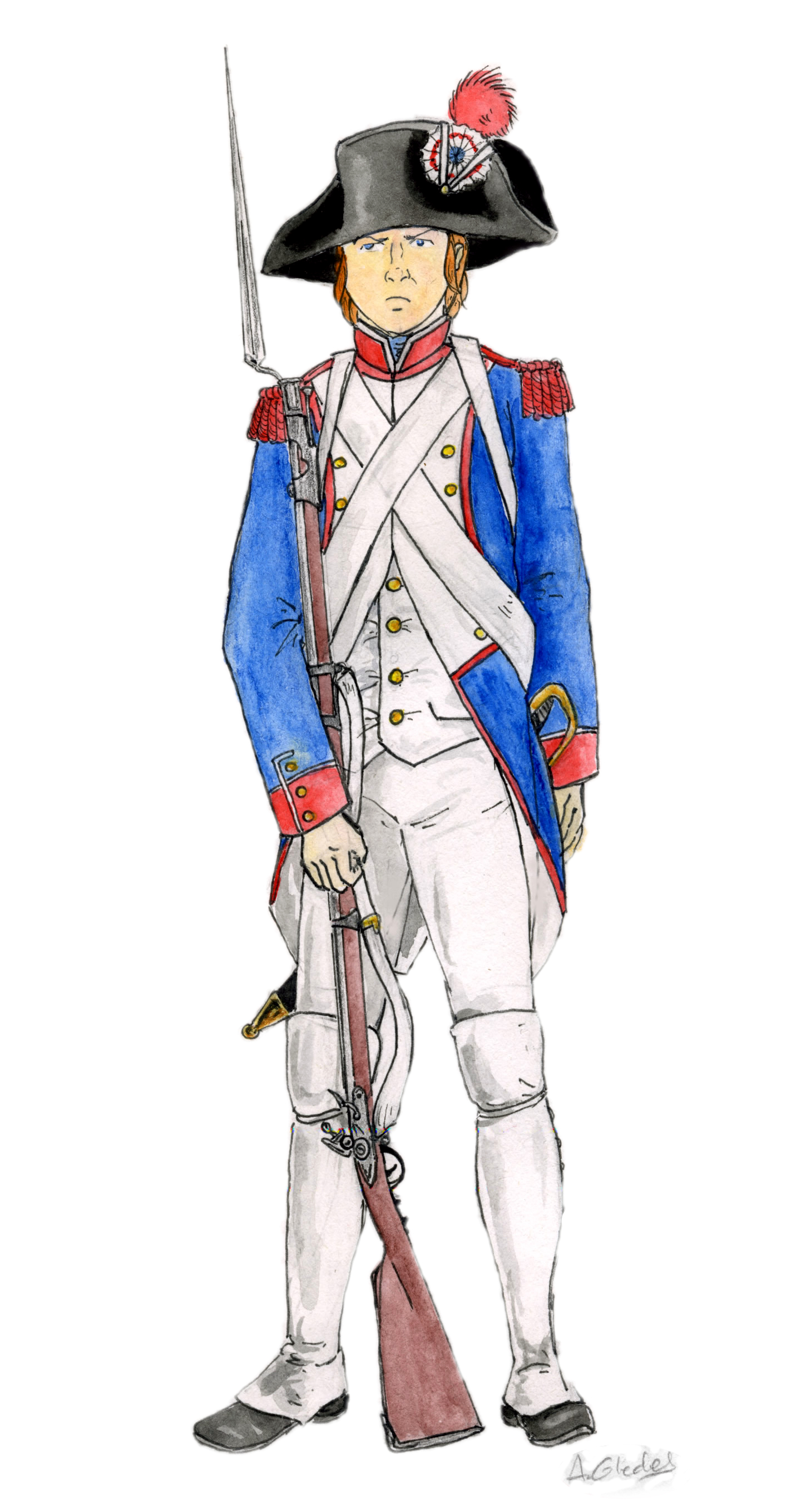
- Fusilier of a French Revolutionary Army
- Active: 29 June 1794 - 29 September 1797 (units merged into Army of Germany)
- Country: French First Republic
- Branch: French Revolutionary Army
- Engagements: War of the First Coalition

Commanders
- Notable commanders: Jean-Baptiste Jourdan; Pierre de Ruel; Jean Marie Moreau; Lazare Hoche; François Joseph Lefebvre

The Army of Sambre and Meuse (French: Armée de Sambre-et-Meuse) was a field army of the French Revolutionary Army. It was formed on 29 June 1794 by combining the Army of the Ardennes, the left wing of the Army of the Moselle and the right wing of the Army of the North. Its maximum paper strength (in 1794) was approximately 120,000.

After an inconclusive campaign in 1795, the French planned a co-ordinated offensive in 1796 using Jean-Baptiste Jourdan's Army of the Sambre et Meuse and the Army of the Rhine and Moselle commanded by his superior, Jean Victor Marie Moreau. The first part of the operation called for Jourdan to cross the Rhine north of Mannheim and divert the Austrians while the Army of the Moselle crossed the southern Rhine at Kehl and Huningen. This was successful and, by July 1796, a series of victories forced the Austrians, commanded by Archduke Charles, to retreat into the German states. By late July, most of the southern German states had been coerced into an armistice. The Army of Sambre and Meuse maneuvered around northern Bavaria and Franconia, and the Army of the Rhine and Moselle operated in Bavaria.

Internal disputes between Moreau and Jourdan and with Jourdan's subordinate commanders within the Army of the Sambre and Meuse prevented the two armies from uniting. This gave the Austrian commander time to reform his own forces, driving Jourdan to the northwest. By the end of September 1796, Charles had permanently separated the two French armies, forcing Jourdan's command further northwest and eventually across the Rhine. On 29 September 1797, the Army of Sambre and Meuse was merged with the Army of the Rhine and Moselle to become the Army of Germany.

== Background ==
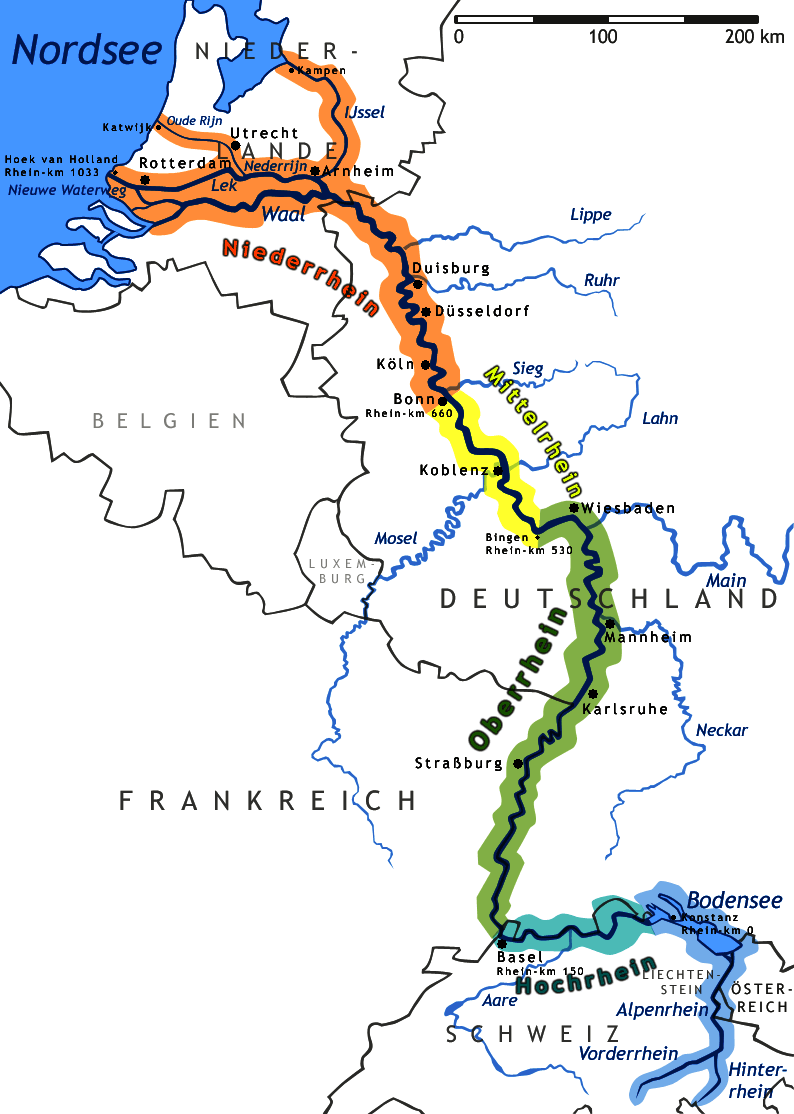
The broad Rhine River and its many tributaries prevented easy escape into France. The colors represent the different sections of the Rhine: Mountain Rhine (Alpenrhein), High Rhine (Hochrhein), Upper Rhine (Oberrhein), Middle Rhine (Mittelrhein), Low Rhine (Niederrhein).

Initially, the rulers of Europe viewed the 1789 revolution in France as an internal matter between the French king and his subjects. In 1790, Leopold succeeded his brother Joseph as emperor of the Holy Roman Empire; by 1791, the danger to his sister, Marie Antoinette and her children, alarmed him. In August 1791, in consultation with French émigré nobles and Frederick William II of Prussia, Leopold's Declaration of Pillnitz articulated that the interests of the monarchs of Europe were as one with the interests of Louis and his family. He and his fellow monarchs threatened unspecified consequences if anything should happen to the royal family. French émigrés continued to agitate for support of a counter-revolution, and on 20 April 1792 the French National Convention declared war on Austria. In this War of the First Coalition (1792–1798), France ranged itself against most of the European states sharing its land or water borders, plus Portugal and the Ottoman Empire.

Although initially successful in the campaigns of 1792 and 1793, the French army lost some effectiveness during the Reign of Terror, during which its generals were intimidated or executed and many of the army's experienced officers left France for safer havens. Elements of the armies that were later formed into the Army of Sambre and Meuse participated in the conquest of the Dutch Republic and the siege of Luxembourg. The various elements of the army won a victory at the Battle of Fleurus on 16 June 1794. The merging of the forces into the Army of Sambre and Meuse was made official soon afterwards. Shortly after Fleurus, the position of the First Coalition in Flanders collapsed and the French armies overran the Austrian Netherlands and the Dutch Republic in the winter of 1794–1795. French and Coalition military strategy subsequently focused on the Rhine river as the principal line of defense: for each side, control of the opposite bank or at least, the river's principal crossings, was the basis of defensive strategy.

=== Geopolitical terrain ===
==== Geography ====
The Rhine River flows west along the border between the German states and the Swiss Cantons. The 80 mi (130 km) stretch between Rheinfall, by Schaffhausen and Basel, is the High Rhine (Hochrhein); it cuts through steep hillsides over a gravel bed, and moves in torrents in such places as the former rapids at Laufenburg. A few miles north and east of Basel, the terrain flattens. The Rhine makes a wide, northerly turn, in what is called the Rhine knee, and enters the so-called Rhine ditch (Rheingraben), part of a rift valley bordered by the Black Forest on the east and Vosges mountains on the west.

The Rhine looked different in the 1790s than it does in the twenty-first century; the passage from Basel to Iffezheim was "corrected" (straightened) between 1817 and 1875. Construction of a canal to control the water level occurred from 1927 to 1974. In 1790, the river was wild and unpredictable, in some places more than four times wider than in the twenty-first century, even under normal conditions. Its channels wound through marsh and meadow and created islands of trees and vegetation that were periodically submerged by floods. Systems of viaducts and causeways made access reliable at Kehl, by Strasbourg, and at Hüningen, by Basel. In 1796, the plain on both sides of the river, some 19 mi (31 km) wide, was dotted with villages and farms. At the furthest edges of the flood plain, especially on the eastern side, the old mountains created dark shadows on the horizon. Tributaries cut through the hilly terrain of the Black Forest, creating deep defiles in the mountains, and became rivulets through the flood plain to the river.

==== Politics ====
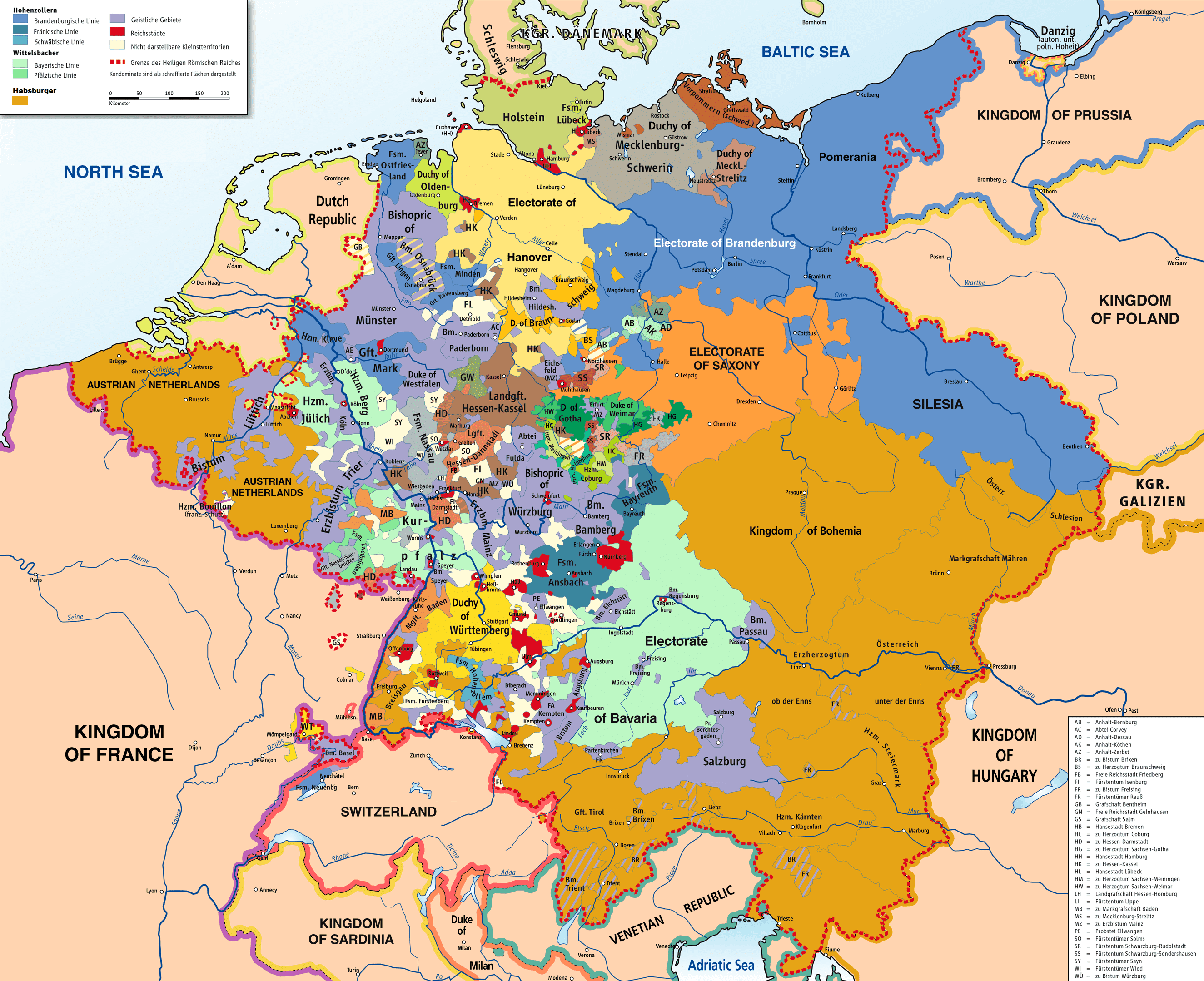
The plethora of states of the Holy Roman Empire was especially dense on the east bank of the Rhine. Some territories were so subdivided they are not named on the map.

The German-speaking states on the east bank of the Rhine were part of the vast complex of territories in central Europe called the Holy Roman Empire. The number of territories in the Empire included more than 1,000 entities. Their size and influence varied, from the Kleinstaaten (little states) that covered no more than a few square miles to large and powerful states. The states and territories involved in late 1796 included the Breisgau (Habsburg), Offenburg and Rottweil (imperial cities), the princely states of Fürstenberg, Neuenburg and Hohenzollern, the Margraviate of Baden, the Duchy of Württemberg, and several dozen ecclesiastic polities. Rule varied: they included free imperial cities of different sizes, such as the powerful Augsburg and the minuscule Weil der Stadt; ecclesiastical territories, also of varying sizes and influence, such as the wealthy Abbey of Reichenau and the powerful Archbishopric of Cologne; and such dynastic states as Württemberg. When viewed on a map, the Empire resembled a Flickenteppich (patchwork carpet). Some states included non-contiguous pieces, the Habsburg domains and Hohenzollern Prussia also governed territories outside the Empire, such as the Habsburg territories in eastern Europe and northern Italy; for others, a village could belong predominantly to one polity but have a farmstead, a house or even one or two strips of land that belonged to another polity. There were also territories surrounded by France that belonged to Württemberg, such as the county of Solm, the archbishopric of Trier and Hesse-Darmstadt. Among the German-speaking states, the Holy Roman Empire's administrative and legal mechanisms provided a venue to resolve disputes between peasants and landlords, between and within jurisdictions. Through the organization of Imperial Circles (Reichskreise), groups of states consolidated resources and promoted regional and organizational interests, including economic cooperation and military protection.

== Purpose and formation ==
=== Military challenges ===
By 1792 the armies of the French Republic were in a state of disruption; experienced soldiers of the Ancien Régime fought side by side with volunteers. Recruits, urged on by revolutionary fervor from the special representatives—agents of the legislature, sent to ensure cooperation among the military—lacked the discipline and training to function efficiently; frequently insubordinate, they often refused orders and undermined unit cohesion. After a defeat, they were capable of mutiny, as Théobald Dillon learned when his troops lynched him in 1792.

The problems of command became more acute following the 1793 introduction of mass conscription (levée en masse). French commanders walked a fine line between the security of the frontier and the Parisian clamor for victory. Add to this the desperate condition of the Army—in training, supplies and leadership—and the military leadership faced a crisis. They were constantly under suspicion from the representatives of the new regime and sometimes from their own soldiers. Failure to achieve unrealistic expectations implied disloyalty and the price of disloyalty was an appointment with Madame guillotine: several of the highest ranking generals, including the aged Nicolas Luckner, Jean Nicolas Houchard, Adam Philippe Custine, Arthur Dillon and Antoine Nicolas Collier, were killed. Francisco de Miranda's failure to take Maastricht landed him in La Force Prison for several years. Many of the old officer class had emigrated, forming émigré armies; the cavalry in particular suffered from their departure and the Hussards du Saxe and the 15éme Cavalerie (Royal Allemande) regiments defected en masse to the Austrians. The artillery arm, considered by the old nobility to be an inferior assignment, was less affected by emigration and survived intact.

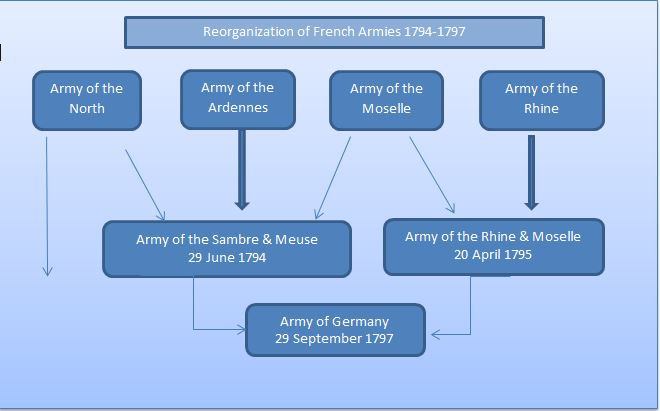
The two principal French Armies of 1794 were formed from four smaller units, each contributing a portion of its troops to either the Sambre and Meuse or the Army of the Rhine and Moselle. The right flank of Army of the North remained in the Netherlands.

Military planners in Paris understood that the upper Rhine Valley, the south-western German territories and Danube river basin held strategic importance for the defense of the Republic. The Rhine offered a formidable barrier to what the French perceived as Austrian aggression and the state that controlled its crossings controlled the river and access into the territories on either side. Ready access across the Rhine and along the Rhine bank between the German states and Switzerland or through the Black Forest, gave access to the upper Danube river valley. For the French, control of the Upper Danube or any point in between, was of immense strategic value and would give the French a reliable approach to Vienna.

=== Original formation ===
Location map depicts distribution of the Army on 1 October 1795 (modern boundaries shown). Troops were positioned within this triangle represented by the three cities.

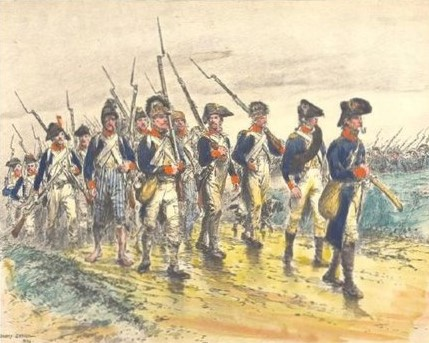
Soldiers of the Army of the Sambre and Meuse, from an 1870s illustration

The basic unit of the army, the demi-brigade, mixed the men of the old army with the recruits from the levee en masse. Ideally, it was designed to include the regular infantry inherited from the old Royal regiments of the King, who were relatively well trained and equipped, dressed in white uniforms and wearing tarleton helmets, with the national guard units, who were less well-trained or equipped, with blue uniforms, and the fédéré volunteer battalions, who were poorly trained and equipped, with no uniform other than a red phrygian cap and a cockade of France. In 1794, the right flank of the Armies of the Center, later called the Army of the Moselle, the entirety of the Armies of the North and the Ardennes formed the Army of the Sambre and Meuse, on 29 June 1794. The remaining units of the former Army of the Center and the Army of the Rhine united initially on 29 November 1794 and formally on 20 April 1795, under command of General Jean-Charles Pichegru as the Army of the Rhine and Moselle. These were the French armies involved in the successes at Fleurus and the Lowlands, but the strength of the units had been enhanced by untrained conscripts.

Pressures exerted by the Coalition forces on the French front at the Rhine required the movement of the Army of Sambre and Meuse troops from the Fortress of Luxembourg, Belgium and the Netherlands into a unit on the middle Rhine. These units were reorganized into task forces that would engage the Austrian and Coalition forces directly in the Rhineland. Its paper strength equaled close to 83,000 men, although its actual strength was considerably less. By 1 October 1795, some of the troops had been assembled in five locations to form an advanced guard of 63,615, men commanded by the veteran General of Division François Joseph Lefebvre. General Louis Friant's division of 3,296 men remained at the Luxembourg fortress and General Antoine Morlot's division of 3,471 remained in Aachen.

==== Hochheim am Main (Zeilsheim and Niederliederbach) ====
- Divisional position unnamed

- Generals of Brigade Jean François Leval, Jean-Baptiste Jacopin and Jean-Joseph Ange d'Hautpoul
- 10th and 13th Demi-brigades Legere
- 8th, 90th and 119th Demi-brigades de Ligne
- 1st, 6th and 9th Chasseurs de Cheval

- Total 12,618 men

==== Herdenheim and Helsheim ====
- General of Division Jacques Louis François Delaistre de Tilly

- General of Brigade Bernard Étienne Marie Duvignau and Jean Thomas Guillaume Lorge
- 23rd, 27th and 72nd Demi brigades de Ligne (3 battalions each)
- Guard Unit Yonne (3 battalions)
- 12th Chasseurs de Chaval

- Total: 9,861 men

==== Weilbach am Main ====
- General of Division Paul Grenier

- Generals of Brigade Henri Simon, Jean-Baptiste Olivié, and Christophe Ossvald
- 110th and 173rd Demi brigades de Ligne
- 112th and 172nd Demi brigades de Ligne (3 battalions each)
- 19th Chasseurs de Chaval
- 4th Hussars

- Total 11,150 men

==== North bank of Main, by streams of Wicker and Weilbach ====
- General of Division André Poncet

- Generals of Brigade Jean-Baptiste Schlachter and Jean-de-Dieu Soult
- 53rd, 87th, 66th and 116th Demi brigades (3 battalions each)
- 7th and 11th Dragoons

- Total: 9,384 men

==== Plateau west of Mainz ====
- General of Division Jean Étienne Championnet

- Generals of Brigade Claude Juste Alexandre Louis Legrand and Louis Klein
- 59th, 132nd and 181st Demi brigades de Ligne (3 battalions each)
- 1st and 12th Dragoon Regiments

- total: 9,816 men

==== Biebrich and Kastel ====
- General of Division Bernadotte

- Generals of Brigade Charles Daurier and Gabriel Barbou des Courières
- 21st Demi-brigade de Legere
- 71st, 111th and 123rd Demi brigades de Ligne (3 battalions each)
- 2nd Hussars and 3rd Chasseurs de Chaval

- Total: 8,223

==== Langenhain and Marxheim ====
- General of Division Louis-Auguste Juvénal des Ursins d'Harville

- 6th, 8th, 10, and 13th Cavalry Regiments (four squadrons each)

- Total 1,593 men

==== Ehrenbreitstein castle ====
- General of Division François Séverin Marceau-Desgraviers

- Generals of Brigade Gilbert Bandy de Nalèche and Jean Hardy
- 1st, 9th, 21st, 26th and 178th Demi brigades de Ligne (3 battalions each)
- 11th Chasseurs de Chaval
- 31st Gendarmes (1 battalion)

- Total 11,240 men

==== Dusseldorf ====
- General of Division Claude-Sylvestre Colaud

- Generals of Brigade Louis Bastoul and Charles Jean Theodore Schoenmezel
- 34th, 112th and 175th Demi brigade de Ligne (3 battalions each)
- four composite battalions of unknown composition
- 2nd and 14th Dragoons
- Total 8,911 men

== Campaign of 1795 ==
In 1795 the French sent the Army of the Sambre and Meuse, also called the northern army, and the Army of the Rhine and Moselle, sometimes called the southern army, in thrusts across the Rhine. After winning a bridgehead on the east bank, the northern French army under Jourdan advanced south to the Main River. On 8 September 1795, Jourdan's northern army crossed the Rhine north of Düsseldorf. Besieging the Bavarian garrison in Düsseldorf, the rest of the Army of Sambre and Meuse swept south as far as the Lahn River, by 20 September. Hemmed in by Lefebvre and 12,600 French troops, Count Hompesch surrendered the Bavarian garrison at Düsseldorf on 21 September.

Threatened by Jourdan's incursion, the Habsburg commander, François Sébastien Charles Joseph de Croix, Count of Clerfayt, shifted his army north to oppose him. This movement gave Pichegru the opportunity to move his army against the weakened rear guard of Clerfayt's force. Despite having a sizable garrison force, Baron von Belderbusch turned over Mannheim and its 471 guns to the Army of Rhine and Moselle after negotiations. The Austrians were furious at their ally but could do nothing to prevent the French from gaining this valuable bridgehead. Pichegru, the commander of the southern French army, proved uncooperative, which allowed Clerfayt to maneuver the bulk of the Austrian forces against Jourdan. Clerfayt crossed the Main to the east, gaining a dangerously exposed position on the French left flank. After being repulsed at Höchst, the French withdrew northwards, eventually abandoning the east bank of the Rhine.

Middle Rhine Campaign, 1795
Date Location	French	Coalition	Victor	Operation
20 September; Mannheim	30,000	6,000	French	The French and the Bavarians negotiated an agreement by which t 9,000 men guarding the fortress surrendered the city.
21 September; Capitulation of Düsseldorf	12,600	2,000	French	Garrison was freed on the condition that it not fight the French for one year.
24 September; Handschuhsheim	12,000 infantry 1,500 cavalry	8,000	Habsburg	The Habsburg cavalry, commanded by Johann von Klenau, caught Dufour's division in the open, scattered the cavalry and mowed down the infantry. General of Brigades Dusirat and General of Division Dufour were wounded and Dufour was captured.
11–12 October; Höchst	10,000	5,500	Habsburg	Despite the French initiative, they were unable to exploit their numerical superiority.
13 October; Niedernhausen	5,000	8,000	Habsburg	The absence of wagons prevented the French from mobilizing their supply train; the Habsburg forces attacked the rear guard, scattered the troops, and captured massive numbers of supplies.
20 September – 13 October; Blockade of Mainz	30,000	19,000	Habsburg	The bulk of the northern Army (Sambre and Meuse) attempted to blockade the city of Mainz, at the juncture of the Rhine and Main rivers.
15 October; Steinbach	unknown	8,000	French	A skirmish north of the Taunus hills near Limburg on the Lahn; continued French withdrawal toward Düsseldorf.
All troop counts and operational objectives, unless otherwise noted, from Smith pp. 105–122.

== Campaign of 1796 ==
The campaign of 1796 was part of the French Revolutionary Wars in which republican France pitted itself against a fluid coalition of Prussians and Austrians and several other states of the Holy Roman Empire, the British, Sardinians, Dutch and royalist French emigres. The French had won several victories but the campaigns of 1793 through 1795 had been less successful. The Coalition partners had difficulty coordinating their war aims and their efforts faltered. In 1794 and 1795, French victories in northern Italy salvaged French enthusiasm for the war and forced the Coalition to withdraw further into Central Europe. At the end of the Rhine Campaign of 1795, the Habsburg Coalition and the French Republicans called a truce between their forces that had been fighting in Germany. The agreement lasted until 20 May 1796, when the Austrians announced that the truce would end on 31 May.

The Austrian Army of the Lower Rhine included 90,000 Habsburg and Imperial troops. The 20,000-man right wing, first under Duke Ferdinand Frederick Augustus of Württemberg, then later under Wilhelm von Wartensleben, stood on the east bank of the Rhine behind the Sieg River, observing the French bridgehead at Düsseldorf. The garrisons of Mainz Fortress and Ehrenbreitstein Fortress included 10,000 more. The remainder of the Imperial and Coalition army, the 80,000-strong Army of the Upper Rhine, secured the west bank behind the Nahe River. Commanded by Dagobert Sigmund von Wurmser, this force anchored its right wing in Kaiserslautern on the west bank, while the left wing under Anton Sztáray, Michael von Fröhlich and Louis Joseph, Prince of Condé guarded the Rhine from Mannheim to Switzerland. The original Austrian strategy was to capture Trier and to use their position on the west bank to strike at each of the French armies in turn. After news arrived in Vienna of Napoleon Bonaparte's successes in northern Italy, Wurmser was sent to there with 25,000 reinforcements and the Aulic Council gave Archduke Charles command over both Austrian armies in the Rhineland and ordered him to hold his ground.

Two French armies opposed the Imperial and Coalition troops. Jean Victor Moreau's commanded both armies, but the northern army, Sambre and Moselle, was large enough for a sub command: Jourdan. The 80,000-man Army of Sambre and Meuse held the west bank of the Rhine down to the Nahe and then southwest to Sankt Wendel. On the army's left flank, Jean Baptiste Kléber had 22,000 troops in an entrenched camp at Düsseldorf. The Army of the Rhine and Moselle, directly commanded by Moreau, was positioned behind (west of) the Rhine from Hüningen, where Pierre Marie Barthélemy Ferino commanded the furthest right wing, northward, along the Queich River near Landau, and with its left wing extended west toward Saarbrücken. The far right wing under.

The French plan called for a spring (April–May–June) offensive, during which two French armies would press against the flanks of the Coalition's northern armies in the German states and a third army approached Vienna through Italy. Jean-Baptiste Jourdan's army would push south from Düsseldorf, hopefully drawing troops toward themselves, while Moreau's army massed on the east side of the Rhine by Mannheim; a deft feint toward Mannheim caused Charles to reposition his troops. Once this occurred, Moreau's army executed a forced march south and, on 23 June, overwhelmed the bridgehead at Kehl. The Imperial troops there included only 7,000 troops recruited that spring from the Swabian Circle polities; despite their lack of experience and training, they held the bridgehead for several hours before retreating toward Rastatt. Moreau reinforced the bridgehead with his forward guard and his troops poured into Baden unhindered. In the south, by the Swiss city of Basel, Ferino's column moved quickly across the river and advanced (eastward) up the Rhine along the Swiss and German shoreline toward Lake Constance, spreading into the southern end of the Black Forest. Worried that his supply lines would be overextended or his army would be flanked, Charles retreated to the east. By the end of July, the entirety of the Swabian Circle, most of Bavaria, Franconia, Baden and Wuerttemberg had reached a separate peace with the French. which disarmed the Imperial army, and gave French free rein to demand supplies from the southern polities.

With Charles absent from the north, Jourdan recrossed the Rhine and drove Wartensleben behind the Lahn river. The Army of Sambre and Meuse defeated its opponents at Friedberg, Hesse on 10 July, while Charles was busy at Ettlingen. Jourdan captured Frankfurt am Main on 16 July. Leaving behind François Séverin Marceau-Desgraviers with 28,000 troops to blockade Mainz and Ehrenbreitstein, Jourdan pressed up the Main River. Following Carnot's strategy, the French commander continually operated against Wartensleben's north flank, causing the Austrian general to fall back. Jourdan's army numbered over 46,000 men, while Wartensleben counted 36,000 troops; Wartensleben refused to attack the larger French force. Buoyed up by their forward movement and by the capture of Austrian supplies, the French captured Würzburg on 4 August. Three days later, the Army of Sambre and Meuse, under the temporary direction of Kléber, won another clash with Wartensleben at Forchheim on 7 August. Despite this success, though, the two French armies remained separated.

Early Rhine Campaign, Spring and Summer 1796
Date Location	French	Coalition	Victor	Operation
15 June; Maudach	27,000 infantry 3,000 cavalry	11,000	French	The opening action on the Upper Rhine, north of Kehl. Moreau and Jourdan coordinated feinting actions to convince Charles that the principal attack would be between the confluence of Rhine, Moselle, and Mainz rivers, and further north. The Coalition force lost 10% of its members, missing, killed, or wounded.
15 June; Wetzlar and Uckerath	11,000	36,000 not all engaged	Coalition	After the early clashes the French withdrew, splitting their force. Jourdan moved westward to secure the bridgehead at Neuwied on the Rhine and Kleber moved to the entrenched camp at Düsseldorf, further north. Charles followed, drawing some of his strength from the force between Strasburg and Speyer.
21 July; Neuwied	unknown force	8,000	French	Jourdan's southernmost flank encountered Imperial and Hessian troops
8 July; Giessen	20,000	4,500	French	The French surprised a weak Austrian garrison and captured the town.
10 July; Friedberg, Hesse	30,000	6,000	French	After hearing of Moreau's successful assault on Kehl, and crossing the river, Jourdan recrossed the Rhine river, attacked Wartensleben's force, and pushed him south to the Main river.
All troop counts and operational objectives, unless otherwise noted, from Smith pp. 111–132.

=== Losing the initiative in late summer ===
Archduke Charles saw that if he could unite with Wartenbsleben, he could pick off the French armies in succession. Having sufficient reinforcements and having transferred his supply line from Vienna to Bohemia, he moved north to unite with Wartensleben. With 25,000 of his best troops, Charles crossed to the north bank of the Danube at Regensburg. On 22 August 1796, Charles and Friedrich Joseph, Count of Nauendorf, encountered Bernadotte's division at Neumarkt. The outnumbered French were driven north west through Altdorf bei Nürnberg to the Pegnitz River. Leaving Friedrich Freiherr von Hotze with a division to pursue Bernadotte, the Archduke thrust north at Jourdan's right flank. The French fell back to Amberg as Charles and Wartensleben's forces converged on the Army of Sambre and Meuse. On 20 August, Moreau sent Jourdan a message vowing to closely follow Charles, which he did not do. In the Battle of Amberg on 24 August, Charles defeated the French and destroyed two battalions of their rear guard. The Austrians lost 400 killed and wounded out of 40,000 troops. Of a total of 34,000 soldiers, the French suffered greater losses of 1,200 killed and wounded plus 800 men and two colors captured. Jourdan retreated first to Sulzbach and then behind the Regnitz river where Bernadotte joined him on 28 August. Hotze and his Habsburg troops reoccupied Nürnberg and Jourdan, who had expected Moreau to keep Charles occupied in the south, found himself outnumbered.

High Summer 1796
Date Location	French	Coalition	Victor	Operation
11 August; Neresheim	47,000	43,000	French	At Neumarkt in der Oberpfalz, Charles brushed aside one of Jourdan's divisions under Major General Jean-Baptiste Bernadotte. This movement placed the Archduke squarely on the French right rear and convinced Wartensleben to turn his force around to join Archduke Charles. After the battle, Charles withdrew his troops further east, pulling Moreau further away from Jourdan's flank, thus weakening the French front. After enticing Moreau away from any possible support of Jourdan's Army of the Sambre and Meuse, Archduke Charles marched north with 27,000 troops to join with Wartensleben on 24 August; their combined force defeated Jourdan at Amberg and further split the French fronts, Jourdan to the north and Moreau to the south. With his more compact line, Charles held a strategically and tactically superior position.
17 August; Sulzbach	25,000	8,000	French	At Sulzbach, a small village 45 km (28 mi) east of Nuremberg, General Kleber led a portion of the Army of the Sambre and Meuse against Lieutenant Field Marshal Paul von Kray. Of the Austrian force, 900 were killed and wounded and 200 captured.
22 August; Neumarkt in der Oberpfalz	unknown	unknown	Habsburg	The number of troops involved is unclear. General Bernadotte commanded part of the Army of the Sambre and Meuse, and Nauendorf commanded part of the Army of the Upper Rhine. Archduke Charles had been unable to convince Wartensleben to march south to join him; consequently, he directed part of his flank north. At this clash, he pushed Bernadotte back to the northwest. Charles also shifted his lines of supply further north, so his supplies were coming from Bohemia instead of from further south.
24 August; Amberg	34,000	40,000	Coalition	Charles struck the French right flank while Wartensleben attacked frontally. The French Army of the Sambre and Meuse was overcome by weight of numbers and Jourdan retired northwest. The Austrians lost only 400 casualties of the 40,000 men they brought onto the field. French losses were 1,200 killed and wounded, plus 800 captured out of 34,000 engaged.
24 August; Friedberg, Bavaria	59,000	35,500	French	On the same day as the battle at Amberg, the French army, which was advancing eastward on the south side of the Danube, managed to catch an isolated Austrian infantry unit, Schröder Infantry Regiment Nr. 7, and the French Army of Condé. In the ensuing clash, the Austrians and Royalists were cut to pieces. Despite Charles' instructions to withdraw northward toward Ingolstadt, Maximilian Anton Karl, Count Baillet de Latour retreated eastward to protect the borders of Austria. This gave Moreau a chance to place his army between the two Austrian forces (Wartensleben's and Charles'), but he did not seize this chance.
All troop counts and operational objectives, unless otherwise noted, from Smith pp. 111–132.

=== Collapse in September 1796 ===
As Jourdan fell back to Schweinfurt, he saw a chance to retrieve his campaign by offering battle at Würzburg, an important stronghold on the Main River. At this point, the petty jealousies and rivalries that had fostered in the Army over the summer came to a head. Jourdan had a spat with his wing commander Kléber and that officer suddenly resigned his command. Two generals from Kléber's clique, Bernadotte and Colaud, also made excuses to leave the army immediately. Faced with this mutiny, Jourdan replaced Bernadotte with General Henri Simon and divided Colaud's rebellious units among the other divisions. Jourdan marched south with 30,000 men of the infantry divisions of Simon, Jean Étienne Championnet, Paul Grenier and with Jacques Philippe Bonnaud's reserve cavalry. Lefebvre's division, 10,000-strong, remained at Schweinfurt to cover a possible retreat.

Anticipating Jourdan's move, Charles had already rushed his army toward Würzburg, where they engaged on 1 September. Marshaling the divisions of Hotze, Sztáray, Kray, Johann Sigismund Riesch, Johann I Joseph, Prince of Liechtenstein and Wartensleben, the Austrians won the Battle of Würzburg on 3 September, forcing the French to retreat to the Lahn river. Charles lost 1,500 casualties out of 44,000 troops against 2,000 French casualties. The losses at Würzburg compelled the French to lift the siege of Mainz on 7 September and to move those troops to reinforce their lines further east. On 10 September, Marceau reinforced the Army of Sambre and Meuse with 12,000 troops that had been blockading the east side of Mainz. Jean Hardy's division from the west side of Mainz retreated to the Nahe river and dug in. The French government belatedly recognized the difficulties in which the Army of the Sambre and Meuse struggled and transferred two divisions commanded by Jacques MacDonald and Jean Castelbert de Castelverd from the idle Army of the North. MacDonald's division stopped at Düsseldorf while Castelverd's was placed in the French line on the lower Lahn. These reinforcements brought Jourdan's strength back to 50,000 but the French abandonment of the sieges at Mainz and later Mannheim and Philippsburg, released about 27,000 Habsburg troops to reinforce Charles' now overwhelming numbers. Moreau continued in the south to press toward Vienna, seemingly oblivious to Jourdan's situation.

Over the next few days, most of the Army of Sambre and Meuse returned to the west bank of the Rhine, except for a small rear guard. After his disastrous panic at Diez in which he prematurely abandoned a critical bridge position, Jean Castelbert de Castelverd held east bank entrenchments at Neuwied, Poncet crossed at Bonn while the other divisions retired behind the Sieg river. Jourdan handed over command to Pierre de Ruel, marquis de Beurnonville, on 22 September. Charles left 32,000 to 36,000 troops commanded by Franz von Werneck in the north, 9,000 more in Mainz and Mannheim to insure the Army did not recross the Rhine, and moved south with 16,000 men to intercept Moreau.

August–September 1796
Date Location	French	Coalition	Victor	Operation
3 September; Würzburg	30,000	30,000	Habsburg	Unfortunately for Moreau, Jourdan's drubbing at Amberg, followed by a second defeat at Würzburg, ruined the French offensive; the French lost any chance of reuniting their front; both Moreau and Jourdan had to withdraw to the west.
7 September; End of Mainz blockade	36,000	50,000	Habsburg	Once Archduke Charles defeated Jourdan's army at Würzburg, Moreau had to withdraw his force from Mainz.
9 September; Wiesbaden	15,000	12,000	Habsburg	Several of the Archduke's forces attacked Jourdan's rearguard. This action forced Jourdan's army to consolidate its front further away from Moreau's line of retreat.
16–18 September; Limburg and Altenkirchen	45,000	20,000	Habsburg	On 16–18 September Charles defeated the Army of Sambre & Meuse in the Battle of Limburg. Kray assaulted Grenier's troops on the French left wing at Giessen but was repulsed. In the struggle, Bonnaud was badly wounded and died six months later. Meanwhile, Charles made his main effort against André Poncet's division of Marceau's right wing at Limburg an der Lahn. After an all-day combat, Poncet's lines still held except for a small bridgehead at nearby Diez. Though not threatened, that night Jean Castelbert de Castelverd, who was holding the bridgehead, panicked and withdrew his division without orders from Marceau. With a gaping hole on their right, Marceau and Bernadotte (now returned to his division) made a fighting withdrawal to Altenkirchen, allowing the left wing to escape. Marceau was fatally wounded on the 19th and died the next morning. This permanently severed the only possible link between Jourdan's and Moreau's armies, leaving Charles free to focus on the Army of the Rhine and Moselle.
17 September; Blockade of Ehrenbreitstein	unknown	2,600	Habsburg	The Habsburg's contingent had been stranded in the fortress since 9 June by portions of Jourdan's rearguard.
18 September; Second Kehl	7,000	5,000	Stalemate	Initially the Austrians were able to take the river crossings at Kehl, but French reinforcements pushed them off the bridges. By the end of the day, the French could not break the Austrian hold on all east shore approaches to the bridges, and the Austrians established a strong cordon that forced Moreau to move south to the remaining bridgehead at Huningen.
2 October; Biberach	35,000	15,000	French	At Biberach an der Riss, 35 km (22 mi) southwest of Ulm, the French army, now in retreat, paused to savage the pursuing Coalition force, who were following too closely. As the outnumbered Latour doggedly followed the French retreat, Moreau lashed out at him at Biberach. For a loss of 500 soldiers killed and wounded, Moreau's troops inflicted 300 killed and wounded and captured 4,000 prisoners, 18 artillery pieces, and two colors. After the engagement, Latour followed the French at a more respectful distance.
All troop counts and operational objectives, unless otherwise noted, from Smith, pp. 111–132.

== Reformation as the Army of Germany (1797) ==
Archduke Charles ruined the French strategy in the north; the Army of Sambre and Meuse withdrew across the river and remained inactive for the rest of the year. On 18 April 1797, with Napoleon's army threatening Vienna, Austria and France agreed to terms of an armistice, which was followed by five months of negotiation, leading to the Peace of Campo Formio which concluded the War of the First Coalition on 18 October 1797. The peace treaty was to be followed up by the Congress of Rastatt. Campo Formio's terms held until 1798, when both groups recovered their military strength and began the War of the Second Coalition. Despite the renewal of military action, the Congress continued its meetings in Rastatt until the assassination of the French delegation in April 1799. The Army of Sambre and Meuse remained in cantonment until 29 September 1797, when it was united with other units, to form the Army of Germany.

== Commanders ==
Image	Name	Dates
Portrait of a man in army uniform and white powdered hair.	Jean-Baptiste Jourdan	2 July 1794 – 23 September 1796; Subordinate Commands: Jacques Maurice Hatry: 21 December 1794 – 28 February 1795 and Jean-Baptiste Kléber: 22 January – 28 February 1796 and 31 July – 7 August 1796
Portrait of man in military coat with military decorations and hat.	Pierre de Ruel, marquis de Beurnonville	23 September 1796 – 23 January 1797
Portrait of a man with shoulder-length hair, simply cut, wearing a modest coat.	Jean Etienne Vachier Championnet	24 – 31 January 1797
portrait of man with short hair, high collared military coat.	Jean Victor Marie Moreau	1 – 25 February 1797
Portrait of a man, facing forward, open collared coat and shirt, disheveled brown hair.	Lazare Hoche	26 February – 18 September 1797 temporary command/armistice in effect
Portrait of a man with curly hair, high collared coat and shirt, and a white sash.	François Joseph Lefebvre	31 July – 3 August 1797 and 19 September – 20 October 1797

== Sources ==
=== Bibliography ===
- Bertaud, Jean Paul and R.R. Palmer (trans). The Army of the French Revolution: From Citizen-Soldiers to Instrument of Power. Princeton: Princeton University Press, 1988. OCLC 17954374
- Blanning, Timothy. The French Revolutionary Wars. New York: Oxford University Press, 1996. ISBN 978-0-3405-6911-5
- (in German) Charles, Archduke of Austria (unattributed). Geschichte des Feldzuges von 1796 in Deutschland. France, 1796. OCLC 693115692
- (in German) Charles, Archduke of Austria, Grundsätze der Strategie: Erläutert durch die Darstellung des Feldzugs von 1796 in Deutschland. Vienna, Strauss, 1819. OCLC 444880753
- (in French) Clerget, Charles. Tableaux des armées françaises: pendant les guerres de la Révolution. R. Chapelot, 1905. OCLC 13730761
- Dodge, Theodore Ayrault. Warfare in the Age of Napoleon: The Revolutionary Wars Against the First Coalition in Northern Europe and the Italian Campaign, 1789–1797. US: Leonaur Ltd., 2011. ISBN 978-0-8570-6598-8.
- Knepper, Thomas P. The Rhine. Handbook for Environmental Chemistry Series, Part L. New York: Springer, 2006. ISBN 9783540293934.
- Lefebvre, Georges, The French Revolution, 1793–1799, Vol. II, Columbia University Press, 1964. ISBN 978-0-6911-6846-3
- Phipps, Ramsey Weston, The Armies of the First French Republic: Volume II The Armées du Moselle, du Rhin, de Sambre-et-Meuse, de Rhin-et-Moselle. Pickle Partners Publishing, 2011 reprint (original publication 1923–1933) ISBN 9781908692252
- (in French) Relation de l'assassinat de M. Théobald Dillon, Maréchal-de-Camp, Commis à Lille, le 29 avril 1792. Imprimerie de Mignaret (4 May 1792). OCLC 560845873
- Rickard, J. Battle of Hochst, 11 October 1795, Battle of Emmendingen; Ettlingen; Siege of Huningue, 26 October 1796 – 19 February 1797; Ettlingen. History of war.org. Accessed 18 November 2014.
- Rothenberg, Gunther E. Napoleon’s Great Adversaries: Archduke Charles and the Austrian Army, 1792–1914. Stroud, (Gloucester): Spellmount, 2007. ISBN 978-1-9086-9225-2
- Smith, Digby. Napoleonic Wars Data Book, New York: Greenhill Press, 1996. ISBN 978-1-8536-7276-7
- Vann, James Allen. The Swabian Kreis: Institutional Growth in the Holy Roman Empire 1648–1715. Vol. LII, Studies Presented to International Commission for the History of Representative and Parliamentary Institutions. Bruxelles: Les Éditions de la Librairie Encyclopédique, 1975. OCLC 2276157
- (in German) Volk, Helmut. "Landschaftsgeschichte und Natürlichkeit der Baumarten in der Rheinaue." Waldschutzgebiete Baden-Württemberg, Band 10, pp. 159–167. OCLC 939802377
- Walker, Mack. German Home Towns: Community, State, and General Estate, 1648–1871. Ithaca: Cornell University Press, 1998. ISBN 0801406706
- Whaley, Joachim, Germany and the Holy Roman Empire: Volume I: Maximilian I to the Peace of Westphalia, 1493–1648. Oxford Univ. Press, 2012. ISBN 978-0-1996-9307-8

=== Additional resources ===
- Alison, Archibald. History of Europe from the Commencement of the French Revolution to the Restoration of the Bourbons, Volume 3. Edinburgh: W. Blackwood, 1847. OCLC 6051293
- Bodart, Gaston. Losses of Life in Modern Wars, Austria-Hungary. London: Clarendon Press, 1916. OCLC 1458451
- The Annual Register: World Events 1796.. London: FC and J Rivington. 1813. Accessed 4 November 2014. OCLC 264471215
- La Bédoyère, Charles Angélique François Huchet, Memoirs of the Public and Private Life of Napoleon Bonaparte. nl, G. Virtue, 1828. OCLC 5207764
- Cuccia, Phillip. Napoleon in Italy: The Sieges of Mantua, 1796–1799. Tulsa: University of Oklahoma Press, 2014.ISBN 9780806144450
- Dunn-Pattison, Richard Phillipson. Napoleon's Marshals. Wakefield, EP Pub., 1977 (reprint of 1895 edition). OCLC 3438894
- Durant, Will and Ariel Durant, The Age of Napoleon. New York: Simon and Schuster, 1975. OCLC 1256901
- (in German) Ebert, Jens-Florian "Feldmarschall-Leutnant Fürst zu Fürstenberg," Die Österreichischen Generäle 1792–1815. Napoleon Online: Portal zu Epoch. Markus Stein, editor. Mannheim, Germany. 14 February 2010 version. Accessed 28 February 2010.
- (in German) Ersch, Johann Samuel. Allgemeine encyclopädie der wissenschaften und künste in alphabetischer folge von genannten schrifts bearbeitet und herausgegeben. Leipzig, J. F. Gleditsch, 1889. OCLC 978611925
- Graham, Thomas, 1st Baron Lynedoch. The History of the Campaign of 1796 in Germany and Italy. London: (np) 1797. OCLC 44868000
- (in French) Lievyns, A., Jean Maurice Verdot, Pierre Bégat, Fastes de la Légion-d'honneur: biographie de tous les décorés accompagnée de l'histoire législative et réglementaire de l'ordre, Bureau de l'administration, 1844. OCLC 3903245
- (in German) Lühe, Hans Eggert Willibald von der. Militär-Conversations-Lexikon:Kehl (Uberfall 1796) & (Belagerung des Bruckenkopfes von 1796–1797), Volume 4. C. Brüggemann, 1834. OCLC 63336793
- Malte-Brun, Conrad. Universal Geography, Or, a Description of All the Parts of the World, on a New Plan: Spain, Portugal, France, Norway, Sweden, Denmark, Belgium, and Holland.. A. Black, 1831. OCLC 1171138
- McLynn, Frank. Napoleon: A Biography. New York: Arcade Pub., 2002. OCLC 49351026
- (in French) Mechel, Christian von, Tableaux historiques et topographiques ou relation exacte.... Basel, 1798. OCLC 715971198
- Millar, Stephen. Austrian infantry organization. Napoleon Series.org, April 2005. Accessed 21 January 2015.
- (in German) "Pichegru." Brockhaus Bilder-Conversations-Lexikon, Band 3. Leipzig, 1839, pp. 495–496. ISBN 978-3-8985-3546-5
- Philippart, John. Memoires etc. of General Moreau. London: A. J. Valpy, 1814. OCLC 8721194
- Rogers, Clifford, et al. The Oxford Encyclopedia of Medieval Warfare and Military Technology. Oxford: Oxford University Press, 2010. ISBN 978-0-1953-3403-6
- Rothenberg, Gunther E. "The Habsburg Army in the Napoleonic Wars (1792–1815)". Military Affairs, 37:1 (Feb. 1973), 1–5. OCLC 4585332
- Rotteck, Carl von. General History of the World, np: C. F. Stollmeyer, 1842. OCLC 653511
- Schama, Simon. Patriots and Liberators. Revolution in the Netherlands 1780–1813. New York: Vintage Books, 1998. OCLC 2331328
- Sellman, R. R. Castles and Fortresses. York (UK): Methuen, 1954. OCLC 12261230
- Wilson, Peter Hamish. German Armies: War and German Politics 1648–1806. London: UCL Press, 1997. OCLC 52081917
