= Jean Castelbert de Castelverd =

- Born: 17 July 1743; Montauban, France
- Died: 10 August 1820 (aged 77)
- Allegiance: Kingdom of France; French First Republic
- Branch: Cavalry, Infantry
- Service years: 1774–1797
- Rank: General of Division
- Conflicts: War of the Pyrenees; Battle of Orbaitzeta; War of the First Coalition; Battle of Limburg
- Awards: Order of Saint-Louis, 1814

Jean Castelbert de Castelverd (17 July 1743 – 10 August 1820) commanded a French division during the French Revolutionary Wars until he lost his nerve during a 1796 battle and was dismissed. In 1792 he assumed command of a volunteer unit. He fought in the War of the Pyrenees against the Kingdom of Spain, winning promotion to general of brigade in 1793 and general of division in 1795. The following year he and his division were sent from Belgium to reinforce the Army of Sambre-et-Meuse which was defending the line of the Lahn River. In the Battle of Limburg in September 1796 he abandoned his position in disobedience to orders even though his troops were not under enemy pressure. He was soon removed from command and retired from the army in 1801.

== Early career ==
Castelverd was born on 17 July 1743 at Montauban in the Tarn-et-Garonne department of France. He appears in the list of the 11th Curaissiers as a ''sous-lieutenant'' on 19 May 1774, in the Royal Roussillon. He also received an award of 300 livres in 1783, in consideration of his services as a first lieutenant of staff. Beyond this, though, his early military career is a mystery: one source identified him as a colonel of the Légion des Volontaires de Luxembourg on 1 October 1785. This was a unit of marines. However, another source gave the colonel's name as Paul-Emmanuel-Sigismond de Montmorency-Luxembourg in 1786. Furthermore, no Castelbert or Castelverd was listed among the legion's five lieutenant colonels nor in the list of other officers. On 16 September 1792, Castelverd emerged as chef de brigade of the Légion des Pyrénées. He served with the Army of the Western Pyrenees during the War of the Pyrenees and was described as a "vigilant officer, full of candor and honor". Castelverd earned promotion to general of brigade on 15 May 1793.

The Spanish claimed to have routed Castelverd's troops during the Battle of Orbaitzeta in October 1794. Another source, named him as co-commander with a general named Dumas of a seven battalion force during this action. On 15 October, Henri François Delaborde and his division advanced south from Elizondo across the Puerto de Belate (Velate Pass), driving Antonio Filanghieri's 2,000 Spanish troops from Lantz. Joined there by Castelverd's column, Delaborde moved east to the royal foundry at Eugi where the French defeated 4,000 Spaniards on the 16th. After another clash on the 17th, the beaten force fell back farther east and joined Pedro Téllez-Girón, 9th Duke of Osuna and his troops near Burguete. Osuna was badly whipped by a different French force near Roncesvalles and abandoned the area to avoid encirclement. The Spanish army was saved from further defeats by the onset of bad weather. On 13 June 1795 Castelverd was elevated in rank to general of division. From that date he led the 4th Division of the Army of the Western Pyrenees.

== Limburg ==
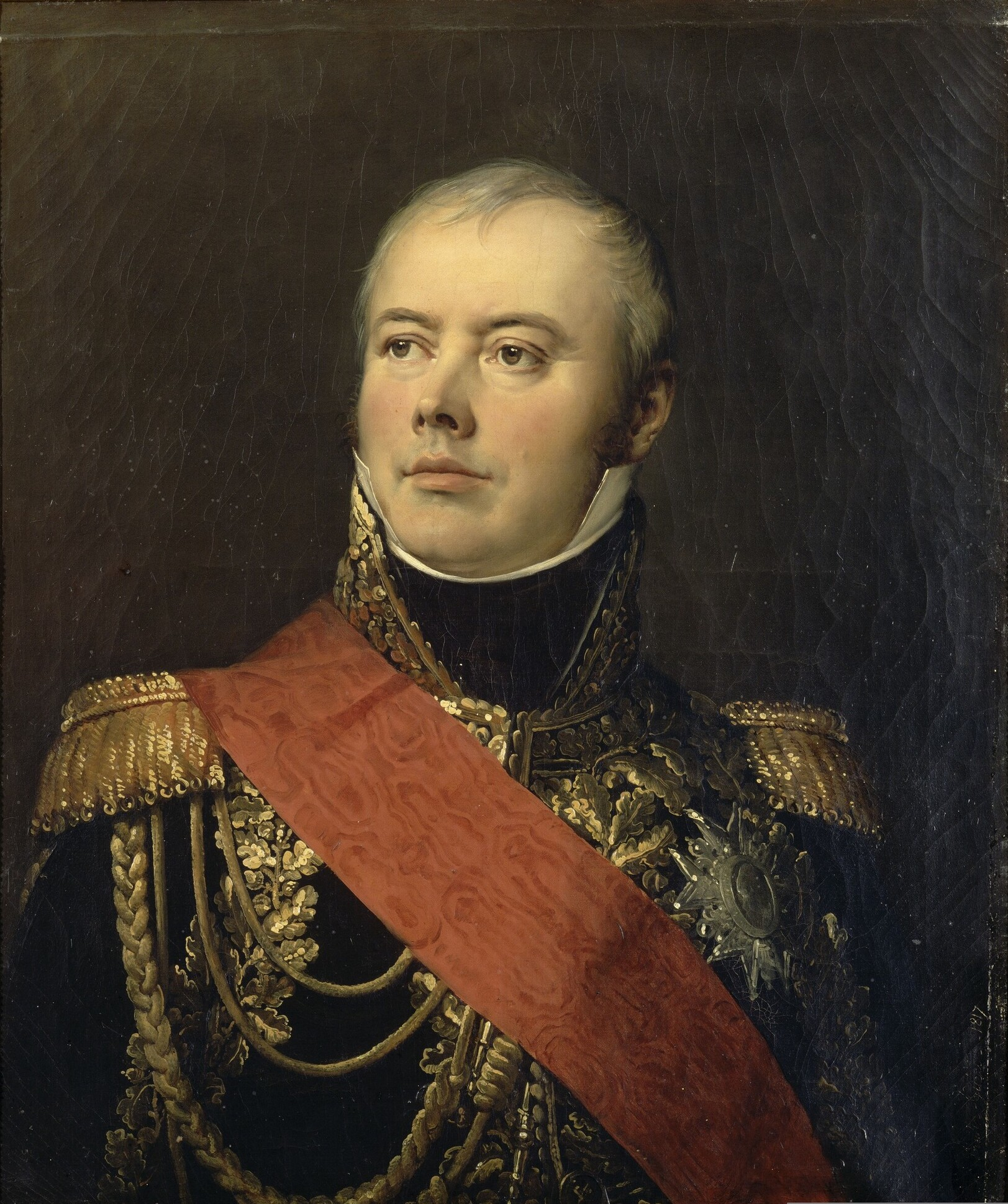
Jacques MacDonald

The Rhine Campaign of 1796 was ending badly for the French when the Army of Sambre-et-Meuse under Jean-Baptiste Jourdan retreated behind the Lahn River on 9 September. With their strategy in ruins, the French Directory belatedly awoke to the reality that the unemployed Army of the North might provide reinforcements. The division of Castelverd from Belgium and the division of Jacques MacDonald from the Netherlands were ordered to go to Jourdan's aid. MacDonald was held back to defend Düsseldorf but Castelverd's troops were inserted into the defenses on the lower Lahn under the direction of the right wing commander François Séverin Marceau-Desgraviers. Jourdan commanded about 50,000 troops altogether.

As the Austrian army of Archduke Charles, Duke of Teschen closed up to the Lahn, Jourdan was particularly sensitive about his left flank. Twice before he had been driven back from the Lahn after the Austrians turned his left flank. This time he placed too much strength near Wetzlar and Giessen. The Battle of Limburg began on 16 September when Austrians under Paul Kray mounted a strong attack against Giessen. Jourdan called up his reserves and repulsed Kray in fighting during which Jacques Philippe Bonnaud was mortally wounded. But Charles launched his main attack against Marceau's position at Limburg an der Lahn and Diez in the center. Despite the odds, the division of André Poncet held its ground stubbornly through eight hours of combat, retaining Limburg but yielding a small bridgehead at Diez. Marceau believed the situation was well in hand and planned to retake Diez the next morning with four battalions of infantry and eight squadrons of cavalry.

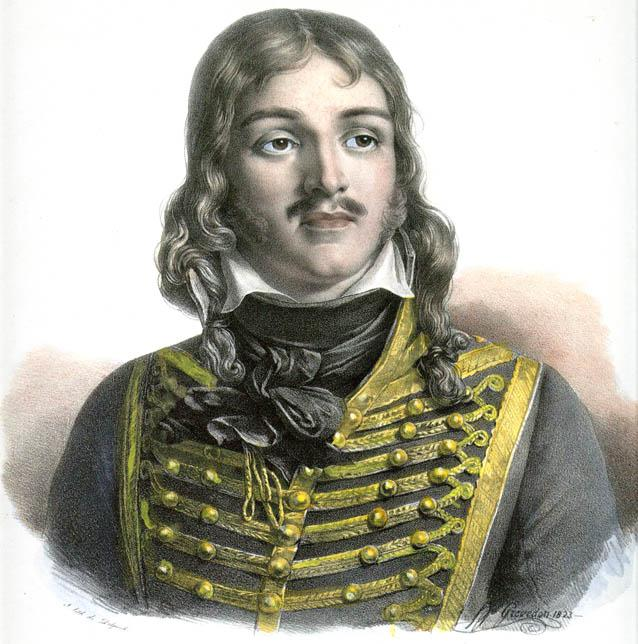
François Marceau

Castelverd's division was positioned to Poncet's right, holding the lower Lahn. His instructions from Marceau were to, "defend the two crossings with the utmost obstinacy, and you will not dream of retreating until after being completely driven in, or after receiving an order to do so." When withdrawal became necessary, Castelverd was to pull back to Montabaur and then to the bridgehead of Neuwied. That evening Adjutant-General Nicolas Léonard Beker arrived at Castelverd's headquarters with the news that the Diez crossing had fallen to the Austrians but that French troops still sealed off the bridgehead. At this point Castelverd lost his head.

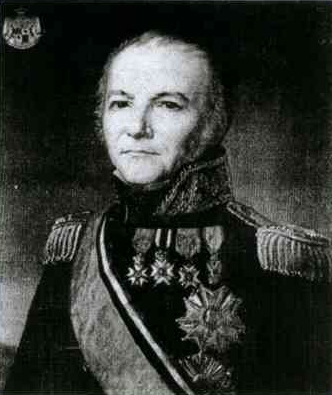
Nicolas Beker

In a panic, Castelverd wrote Marceau, "It is thus clear that the Limburg crossing is forced. I do not hesitate therefore to order the retreat." The withdrawal to Montabaur started at once. When he received the message, Marceau ordered Castelverd to turn around and reoccupy his former lines. By the next morning, Jean-Baptiste Bernadotte's division of reinforcements had not yet arrived. Worried that Castelverd would not get back into position in time and that Archduke Charles had been reinforced, Marceau ordered the right wing to retreat at 9:00 am on the 17th. Covered by fog, the French slipped away. When Bernadotte's division came on the scene, it acted as rear guard in holding off the advancing Austrians.

Jourdan's left wing was in serious trouble because it had to retreat through Altenkirchen. This place was nearer to the archduke's Austrians than it was to the French left wing. Fortunately for Jourdan, Marceau and Bernadotte capably held off the Austrian advance guards long enough for the French left wing to barely get away. Meanwhile, Castelverd withdrew into Neuwied's bridgehead where his troops were secure behind prepared fortifications. On 19 September, as the last French columns were still filing through Altenkirchen, Jourdan ordered Marceau to hold on a little longer with Poncet's division. During the fighting Marceau was fatally hit by a bullet and died early the next morning.

Afterward, MacDonald asked Castelverd why he retreated when the enemy wasn't pressing him and giving his commander such short notice of his action. Castelverd angrily replied:

Ah, bah! The buggers! They would like to throw the blame for their defeat on the Army of the North, but they wanted nothing better than a pretext for getting off, and, since they have made a retreat of eight leagues, I have quite well made one of ten. Let them go and be buggered!

Obviously, part of the problem was the bad feelings between rival French armies. But on the march to the Lahn, Castelverd had stalled, fearing he was joining a defeated army. He also believed a ridiculous story that the Austrians had gotten behind Jourdan's army and were headed for Coblenz and Düsseldorf to cut them off.

The disgraced Castelverd was replaced by Jacques Desjardin. The division continued to serve with the Army of Sambre-et-Meuse and numbered 8,830 men when Desjardin assumed command. Castelverd retired from the army on 13 February 1797 and became eligible for a retirement pension in 1801. He received the Order of Saint-Louis in 1814 and was allowed to add de Castelverd to his name on 19 March 1819.
