= Jacques Maurice Hatry =

French general

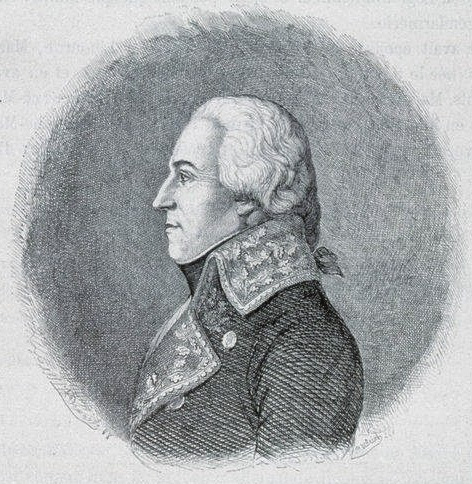
Jacques Maurice Hatry, engraving

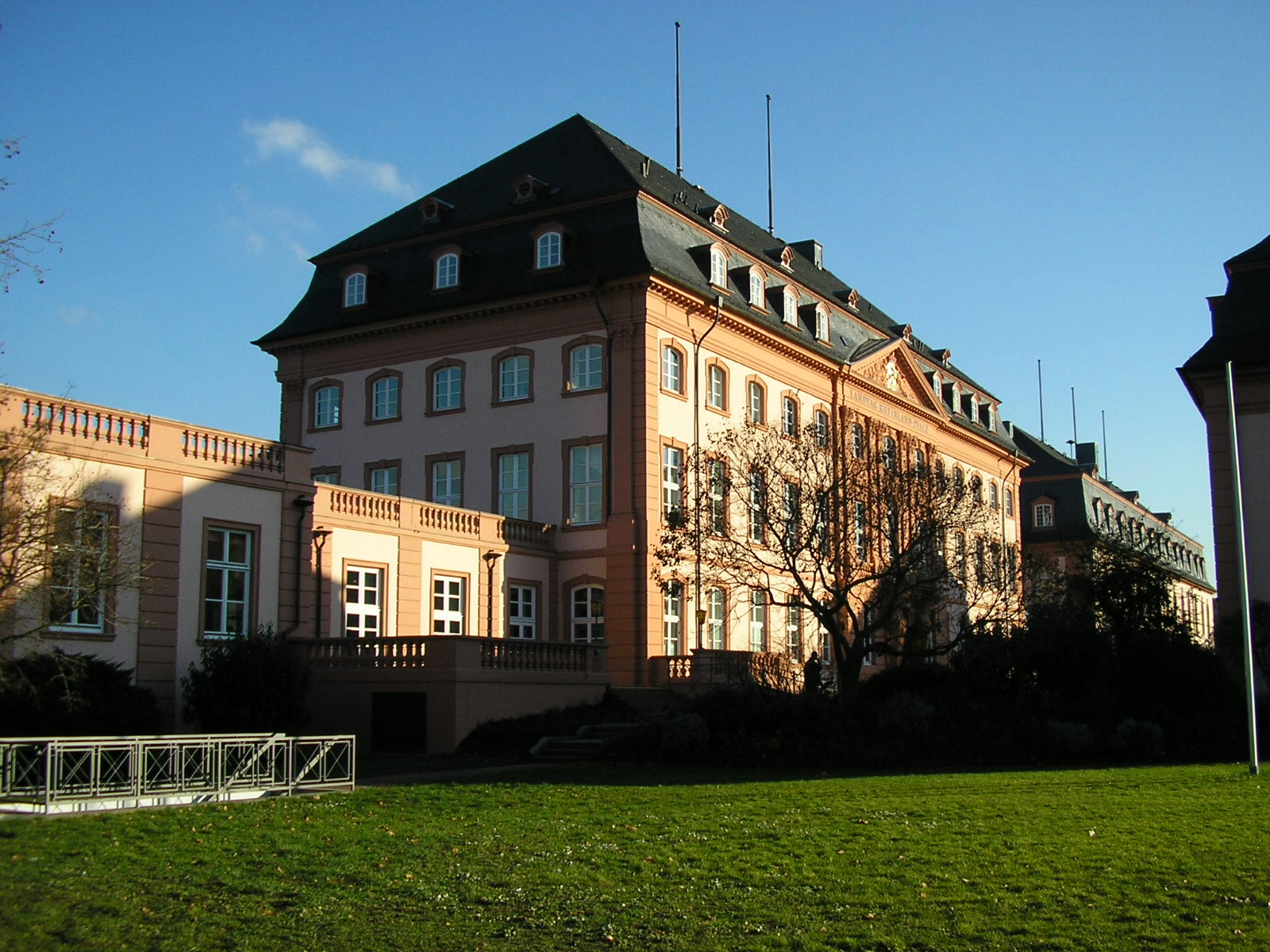
The Deutschhaus Mainz at Mainz, where Hatry lived after 29 January 1798

Jacques Maurice Hatry (French pronunciation: [ʒak mɔʁis atʁi]; Strasbourg, 12 February 1742 – Paris, 30 November 1802) was a French general.

A colonel on the outbreak of the French Revolution, he rose to général de division in 1794 and fought with distinction in the armée du Nord, des armée des Ardennes and Armée de la Moselle at the Battle of Fleurus and blockade of Luxembourg (where he forced a garrison of 12,000 men to surrender). In the armée de Sambre-et-Meuse, in the 1796 campaign, he was made général en chef of the armée de Mayence. In June 1798 he replaced general Joubert as commander of the troops stationed in the Netherlands. He was one of the first members of the Sénat conservateur in December 1799. His name is engraved on the north pillar, column 5, of the Arc de Triomphe.

== Sources ==
- Mullié, Charles (1852). "Hatry (Jacques-Maurice)" . Biographie des célébrités militaires des armées de terre et de mer de 1789 à 1850 (in French). Paris: Poignavant et Compagnie.
- Six, Georges (1934). "Hatry (Jacques-Maurice)". Dictionnaire biographique des généraux et amiraux français de la Révolution et de l'Empire: 1792–1814 (in French). Vol. 1. Paris: Librairie Historique et Nobilaire. pp. 562–563.
