= André Poncet =

French general (1755–1838)

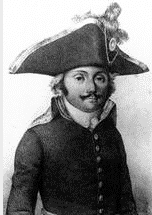
- Born: 30 July 1755; Pesmes, France
- Died: 23 July 1838 (aged 82); Montmirey-le-Château, France
- Military career
- Allegiance: France
- Branch: Infantry
- Service years: 1771–1811
- Rank: General of Division
- Conflicts: American Revolutionary War; Siege of Yorktown; War of the First Coalition; Battle of Fleurus; Siege of Maastricht; Battle of Höchst; Battle of Limburg
- Awards: Légion d'Honneur, 1804

André Poncet (French: [ɑ̃dʁe pɔ̃sɛ]; 30 July 1755 – 23 July 1838) commanded a French infantry division during the French Revolutionary Wars. He joined the French Royal Army in a famous regiment and fought in the American Revolutionary War. Becoming a general officer in early 1794, he fought at Fleurus, Maastricht and other actions. He led a division in the Rhine Campaign of 1795 at Höchst and in the Rhine Campaign of 1796 at Limburg. Afterward, he held interior posts until his retirement from the military in 1811. He became mayor of his home town of Pesmes. When it was occupied by the Austrians in 1814, he was arrested and confined in the Palanok Castle in distant Transylvania for five months. He became a farmer and died in 1838 after returning to France. His surname is one of the names inscribed under the Arc de Triomphe, on Column 6.
