= Battle of Limburg (1796) =

Battle of the War of the First Coalition

Coordinates: 50°23′N 8°4′E

- Part of the War of the First Coalition
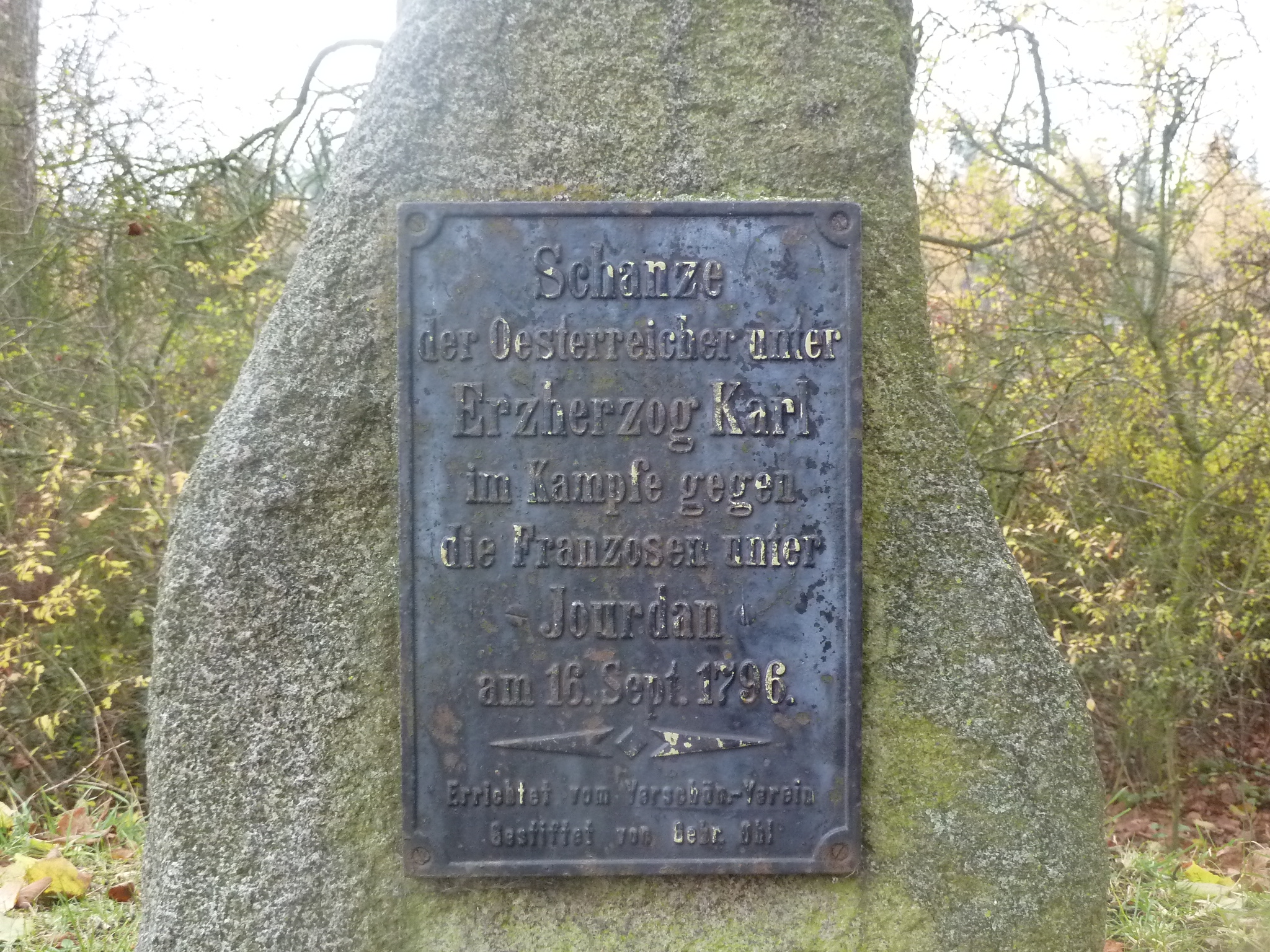
- Marker indicating the location of the Austrian line
Date	16–19 September 1796
Location	Limburg an der Lahn, Germany
Result	Austrian victory

Belligerents
Republican France	(Habsburg monarchy) Habsburg Austria

Commanders and leaders
(France) Jean-Baptiste Jourdan	(Habsburg monarchy) Archduke Charles

Units involved
Army of Sambre-et-Meuse	Army of the Lower Rhine

Strength
45,000	20,000

Sometimes called the Battle of Limburg or Second Battle of Altenkirchen or Battle of the Lahn (16–19 September 1796), this was actually a single-day battle followed by a lengthy rear-guard action. The action occurred during the War of the First Coalition, part of a wider conflict known as the French Revolutionary Wars. Limburg an der Lahn is located in the state of Hesse in Germany about 31 miles (50 km) east of Koblenz. On 16 September, the Habsburg Austrian army commanded by Archduke Charles, Duke of Teschen attacked a Republican French army led by Jean-Baptiste Jourdan in its positions behind the Lahn River. The unexpected collapse and withdrawal of their right flank on the evening of the 16th compelled the French to make a fighting withdrawal that began in the evening of the 16th and continued until late on 19 September.

Two French armies were initially successful in the Rhine Campaign of 1796, penetrating far into southern Germany. However, Archduke Charles defeated Jourdan's army at Amberg and Würzburg in the late summer, forcing the French to retreat to the Lahn. On the 16th, Charles launched an attack at Giessen on Jourdan's left flank, but his main assault was intended to crack the French center at Limburg an der Lahn. Though both Austrian thrusts stalled, Jourdan was forced to withdraw when the French right flank commander Jean Castelbert de Castelverd ordered his troops to fall back. During the next three days, the French center under François Séverin Marceau-Desgraviers and Jean Baptiste Bernadotte made a fighting retreat back to Altenkirchen so that Jourdan's left flank troops could escape. French division commanders Marceau and Jacques Philippe Bonnaud were fatally wounded in the various clashes. After the battle Jourdan pulled most of his army back to the west bank of the Rhine, effectively ending the campaign in the north. Leaving Franz von Werneck with a reduced army to watch the French, Charles turned south, hoping to cut off a second French army under Jean Victor Marie Moreau.

== Background ==
At the end of the Rhine Campaign of 1795 the two sides called a truce in January 1796. This agreement lasted until 20 May 1796 when the Austrians announced that it would end on 31 May. The Coalition Army of the Lower Rhine included 90,000 troops. The 20,000-man right wing under Duke Ferdinand Frederick Augustus of Württemberg stood on the east bank of the Rhine behind the Sieg River, observing the French bridgehead at Düsseldorf. The garrisons of Mainz Fortress and Ehrenbreitstein Fortress counted 10,000 more. Charles posted the remainder of the Habsburg and Coalition force on the west bank behind the Nahe. (Note: The First Coalition included Habsburg Austria, the Holy Roman Empire, Prussia, Spain and the Dutch Republic until 1795, Sardinia until 1796, Sicily and several other Italian states (at various times and duration), French royalists (mostly those in the Prince Conde's emigre army and Great Britain.) Dagobert Sigmund von Wurmser led the 80,000-strong Army of the Upper Rhine. Its right wing occupied Kaiserslautern on the west bank while the left wing under Anton Sztáray, Michael von Fröhlich and Louis Joseph, Prince of Condé guarded the Rhine from Mannheim to Switzerland. The original Austrian strategy was to capture Trier and to use their position on the west bank to strike at each of the French armies in turn. However, after news arrived in Vienna of Bonaparte's successes, Wurmser was sent to Italy with 25,000 reinforcements. Reconsidering the situation, the Aulic Council gave Archduke Charles command over both Austrian armies and ordered him to hold his ground.

On the French side, the 80,000-man Army of Sambre-et-Meuse held the west bank of the Rhine south to the Nahe and then southwest to Sankt Wendel. On the army's left flank, Jean Baptiste Kléber commanded 22,000 troops in an entrenched camp at Düsseldorf. The right wing of the Army of Rhin-et-Moselle was positioned behind the Rhine from Hüningen northward, its center stood along the Queich River near Landau and its left wing extended west toward Saarbrücken. Pierre Marie Barthélemy Ferino led Moreau's right wing, Louis Desaix commanded the center and Laurent Gouvion Saint-Cyr directed the left wing. Ferino's wing consisted of three infantry and cavalry divisions under Bourcier and Delaborde. Desaix's command counted three divisions led by Beaupuy, Delmas and Xaintrailles. Saint-Cyr's wing had two divisions commanded by Duhesme, and Taponier.

The French grand plan called for two French armies to press against the flanks of the northern armies in the German states while simultaneously a third army approached Vienna through Italy. Jourdan's army would push southeast from Düsseldorf, hopefully drawing troops and attention toward themselves, which would allow Moreau's army an easier crossing of the Rhine between Kehl and Hüningen. According to plan, Jourdan's army feinted toward Mannheim, and Charles quickly reapportioned his troops. Moreau's army attacked the bridgehead at Kehl, which was guarded by 7,000 imperial troops—troops recruited that spring from the Swabian circle polities, inexperienced and untrained—which amazingly held the bridgehead for several hours, but then retreated toward Rastatt. On 23–24 June, Moreau reinforced the bridgehead with his forward guard. After pushing the imperial militia from their post on the bridgehead, his troops poured into Baden unhindered. Similarly, in the south, by Basel, Ferino's column moved speedily across the river and proceeded up the Rhine along the Swiss and German shoreline, toward Lake Constance and into the southern end of the Black Forest. Anxious that his supply lines would be overextended, Charles began a retreat to the east.

At this point, the inherent jealousies and competition between generals came into play. Moreau could have joined up with Jourdan's army in the north, but did not; he proceeded eastward, pushing Charles into Bavaria. Jourdan also moved eastward, pushing Wartensleben's autonomous corps into the Ernestine duchies and neither general seemed willing to unite his flank with his compatriot's. There followed a summer of strategic retreats, flanking, and reflanking maneuvers. On either side, the union of two armies—Wartensleben's with Charles’ or Jourdan's with Moreau's—could have crushed the opposition. Wartensleben and Charles united first, and the tide turned against the French. With 25,000 of his best troops, the Archduke crossed to the north bank of the Danube at Regensburg and moved north to join his colleague Wartensleben. The defeat of Jourdan's army at the Amberg, Würzburg and Limburg an der Lahn allowed Charles to move more troops to the south.

== Locale ==
In the early 19th century, Limburg an der Lahn, was a Hessian residence city in the early 19th century. The region had been settled by Celts, followed by the Romans, at the beginning of the Common Era, and remained a central and productive agricultural region. The town of Limburg lies roughly mid-way between Westerwald and the Taunus mountains. Slate mountains to the east and the Lahn river encircling the city, plus its rich agricultural potential of soil and climate, made it one of Hesse's richest agricultural regions, and with its convenient Lahn crossing, it has been of great importance to transport since the Middle Ages. Within the basin, the Lahn's otherwise rather narrow lower valley broadens out noticeably. Limburg's mean elevation is 384 ft (117 m) above sea level.

== Dispositions ==
By early September, Archduke Charles defeated Jourdan's army at Amberg and Würzburg and the French had retreated 221 km (137 mi) northwest across the foothills of the Vogelsberg mountains, reaching the Lahn on 9 September. Jourdan arrived with 25,000 infantry, 5,000 cavalry, and about 6 artillery batteries. There Jourdan's army was joined by 16,000 fresh troops commanded by General François Séverin Marceau-Desgraviers (Marceau), who had abandoned his blockade of Mainz. With his now superior numbers, Jourdan decided to defend the line of the Lahn in the hope that he could keep the Archduke's army occupied, and prevent him from turning south to attack Jean Victor Moreau's army in the Black Forest. With some kind of luck, he himself might be able to slip away to the south and join with Moreau as he defiled from the Black Forest.

After pausing in Würzburg only long enough to capture the fortress, the Archduke arrived at the Lahn on 11 September. His determined pursuit prevented the French from turning south to join with Moreau's sizable force crossing the Black Forest. Recognizing Jourdan's established position and superior numbers, Charles decided to feint toward the French left, at Paul Grenier's division at Giessen and Lefebvre's division at Wetzlar, creating a distraction; he would actually attack at the French right flank. To achieve this goal, he ordered Paul Kray’s and Anton Sztaray’s divisions to create as much noise and confusion as possible to convince Jourdan that the Austrian main army was on its left flank and the attack would come from the left. The divisions were so successful that, by 15 September, the French had concentrated most of their strength on their left. Marceau was posted between the Rhine and Limburg, with his advance guard at Mensfelden, 3–4 mi (5–6 km) southeast of the city. Bernadotte was 5 mi (8 km) to the east, at Runkel, Jean Étienne Championnet was 6 mi (10 km) further to the northeast, at Weilburg.

Jourdan's troops were stationed at the eastern shore of the Rhine. Moreau, considerably further to the south, could be of no use to him, nor he to Moreau.

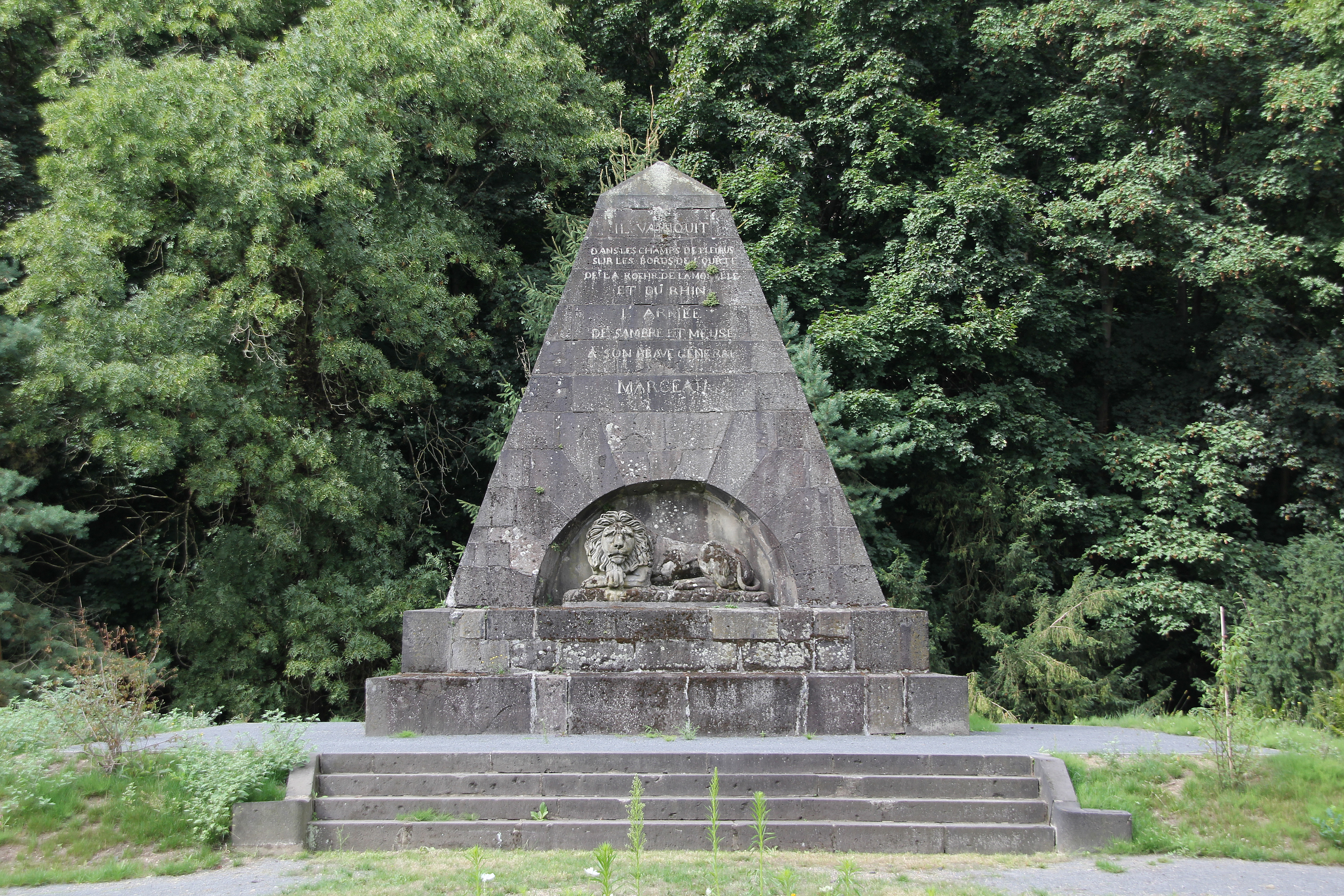
Monument to Marceau at the French cemetery in Koblenz

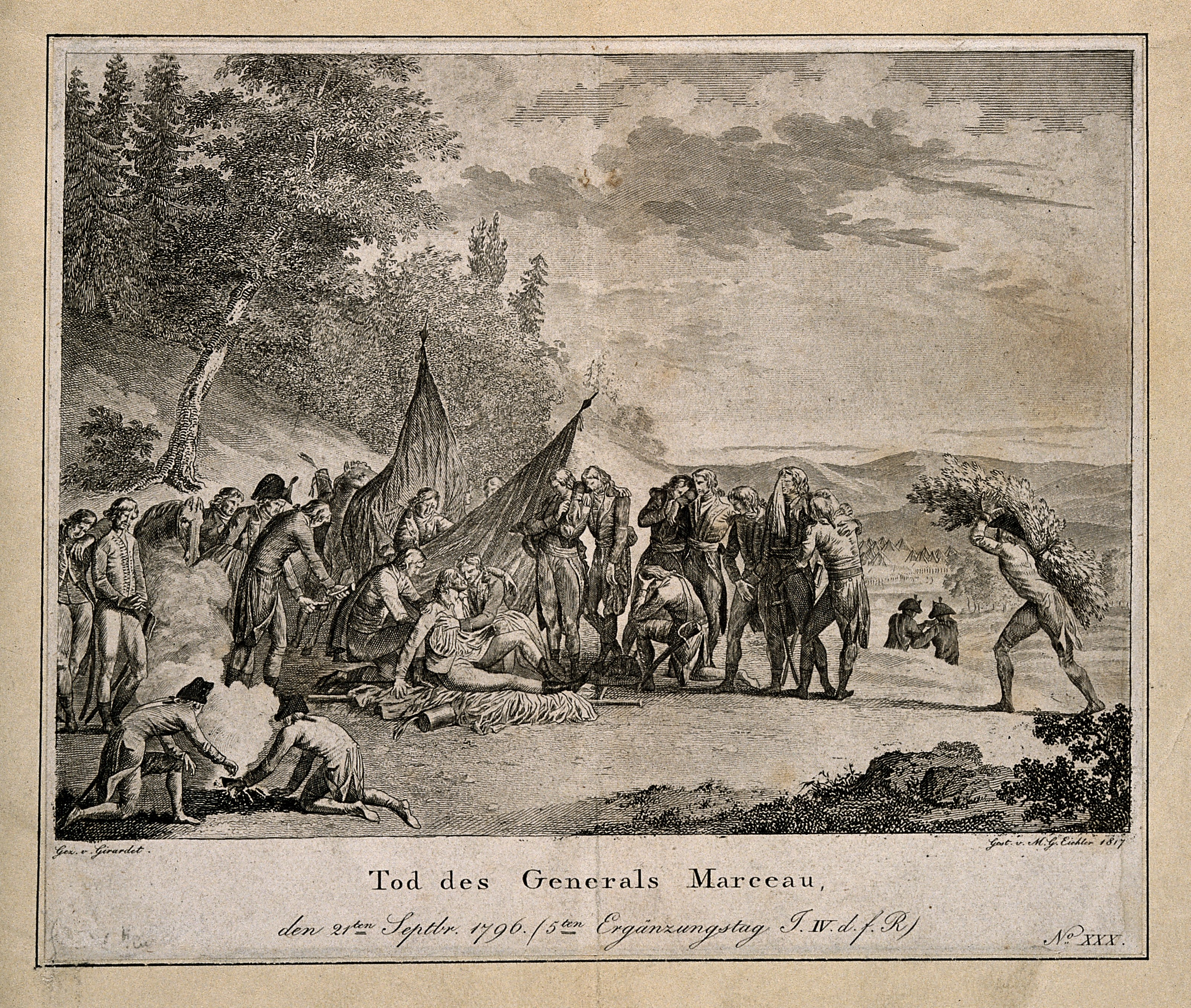
An engraving of Marceau's death

== Battle ==
On the morning of 16 September, the Archduke drove Marceau's outposts out of Mensfelden and captured Diez and Limburg. For the moment, Marceau retained control of Limburg's suburb on the north bank of the Lahn. The Archduke brought up his artillery, captured Limburg Bridge, and drove Marceau and his men from the suburb. Marceau was able to prevent the Habsburg army from advancing any further, and the Austrian attack stalled there. The French then counterattacked, and drove the Austrians back across the Lahn. The suburb changed hands two more times that day, but when night fell, it was in French hands.

During the night, the Archduke prepared for a renewed attack across the Lahn, in four columns, and in greater numbers than he had sent the day before. For his part, Marceau prepared to resist, but to his right, General Jean Castelbert de Castelverd, positioned between Diez and the Rhine, feared an Austrian breakthrough at Limburg would leave him trapped with his back to the Rhine; he panicked and withdrew his troops to Montabauer. This exposed Marceau's right wing, so he pulled his troops back to Molsberg. Marceau's retreat subsequently exposed the French center, which also was forced to withdraw; by the end of 17 September, the entire French line had unraveled.

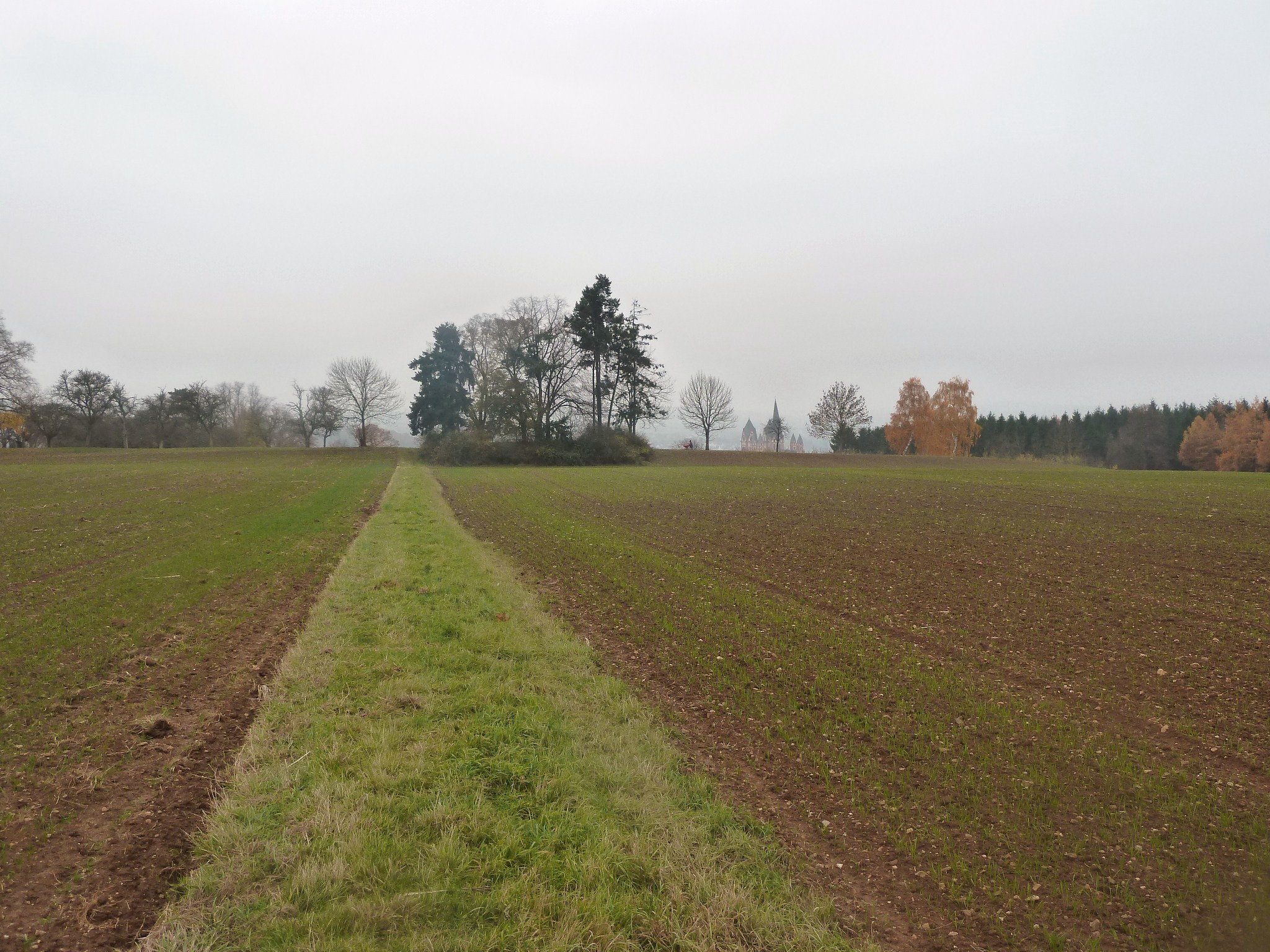
Remains of the Austrian redoubt outside Limburg

=== Second battle of Altenkirchen ===
While Jourdan's army withdrew from Limburg, Marceau's troops provided the rearguard, holding off the main Austrian army long enough to allow the French center and left to reach Altenkirchen. On 18 September, most of the day was occupied with a general withdrawal took place around Molsberg and Freilingen, where Marceau was ordered to fight a delaying action to give the French left time to catch up with the center, which had already reached Höhn and Schönberg (a hamlet near Höhn). Marceau remained close to Molsberg for the entire day. When he learned that the main army had started to pass through Altenkirchen, he realized he should begin his own retreat from Molsberg and Freilingen, but he arrived at the northern edge of the Höchstenbach before Grenier's and Championnet's divisions had completely passed through the town Jourdan ordered Marceau to make a stand at Altenkirch so that Grenier's and Championnet's divisions could get through safely. Marceau led the main body of his division back to support the rearguard but, while he was scouting the Austrian positions, he was shot and mortally wounded. (Note: It is unclear if Bernadotte or Lefabvre took over command from Marceau.) Marceau's rattled troops rallied for long enough to prevent the Austrians from breaking the army apart; realizing that the French had escaped him, Charles camped the night at Freilingen. If his goal had been to break apart Jourdan's army, he had nearly succeeded; if it had been to prevent Jourdan from uniting with Moreau, he had succeeded.

== Aftermath ==
Badly injured, Marceau remained in Altenkirchen and received several visits from Austrian officers, including Paul Kray. He died two days later in the early morning on 21 September, just before the Archduke arrived to pay his respects. On 23 September, the Austrians handed Marceau's body to the French at the bridgehead in Neuwied, and he was buried in Coblenz. Both sides offered gunfire salutes. Jacques Philippe Bonnaud was also killed in the rear guard action.

The French retreated further north, to the River Sieg, and Charles left a small force commanded by Franz von Werneck at Altenkirchen to keep them contained; he himself turned southward to deal with Moreau and his army crossing through the Black Forest. The next contact occurred on 19 October at Emmendingen.

== Notes, citations, and sources ==
=== Sources cited ===
- Dodge, Theodore Ayrault (2011). Warfare in the Age of Napoleon: The Revolutionary Wars Against the First Coalition in Northern Europe and the Italian Campaign, 1789-1797. USA: Leonaur Ltd. ISBN 978-0-85706-598-8.
- Phipps, Ramsay Weston (2011). The Armies of the First French Republic: Volume II The Armées du Moselle, du Rhin, de Sambre-et-Meuse, de Rhin-et-Moselle. USA: Pickle Partners Publishing. ISBN 978-1-908692-25-2.
- Rickard, J. (2009). "Combat of Giessen, 16 September 1796". historyofwar.org.
- Rickard, J. (2009). "Combat of Limburg, 16 September 1796". historyofwar.org.
- Rickard, J. (2009). "Second battle of Altenkirchen, 19 September 1796". historyofwar.org.
- Smith, Digby (1998). The Napoleonic Wars Data Book. London: Greenhill. ISBN 1-85367-276-9.
