= Aubiat =

- Commune
- Coat of arms
- Location of Aubiat
- Location within France Location within Auvergne-Rhône-Alpes
- Coordinates: 45°58′43″N 3°10′06″E
- Country: France
- Region: Auvergne-Rhône-Alpes
- Department: Puy-de-Dôme
- Arrondissement: Riom
- Canton: Aigueperse
- Intercommunality: CC Plaine Limagne

Government
  - Mayor (2026–32): Carmen Fuentes
- Area^{1}: 14.79 km^{2} (5.71 sq mi)
- Elevation: 360 m (1,180 ft)
- Highest elevation: 385 m (1,263 ft)
- Lowest elevation: 323 m (1,060 ft)
- Population (2023): 1,023
  - Density: 69.17/km^{2} (179.1/sq mi)
- Time zone: UTC+01:00 (CET)
  - Summer (DST): UTC+02:00 (CEST)
- INSEE/Postal code: 63013 /63260
- ^{1} French Land Register data, which excludes lakes, ponds, glaciers > 1 km^{2} (0.386 sq mi or 247 acres) and river estuaries.

Aubiat (French pronunciation: [obja]) is a commune in the Puy-de-Dôme department in Auvergne-Rhône-Alpes in central France.

== Population ==
Historical population
Year	Pop.	±% p.a.
1968	627	—
1975	632	+0.11%
1982	642	+0.22%
1990	696	+1.01%
1999	718	+0.35%
2007	820	+1.67%
2012	932	+2.59%
2017	890	−0.92%
2023	1,023	+2.35%
Source: INSEE

== See also ==
- Communes of the Puy-de-Dôme department
