= Theodore Ayrault Dodge =

United States Army officer and author (1842–1909)

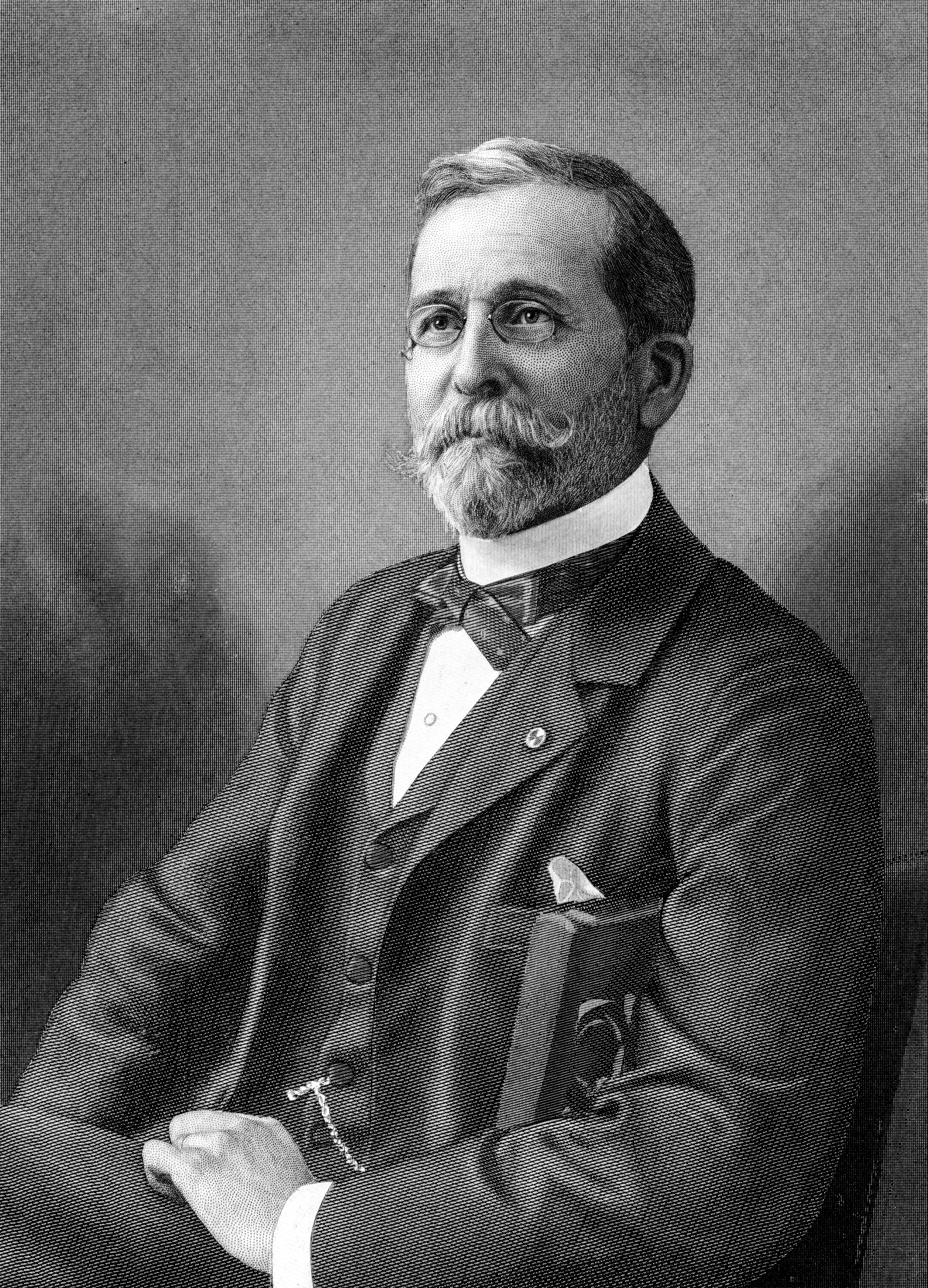
- Born: May 28, 1842; Pittsfield, Massachusetts, US
- Died: October 26, 1909 (aged 67); Paris, France
- Resting place: Arlington National Cemetery
- Occupations: Military officer and historian
- Known for: Civil War and the great generals of ancient and European history
- Notable work: The Campaign of Chancellorsville (1881) and Bird's Eye View of the Civil War (1883)

Signature
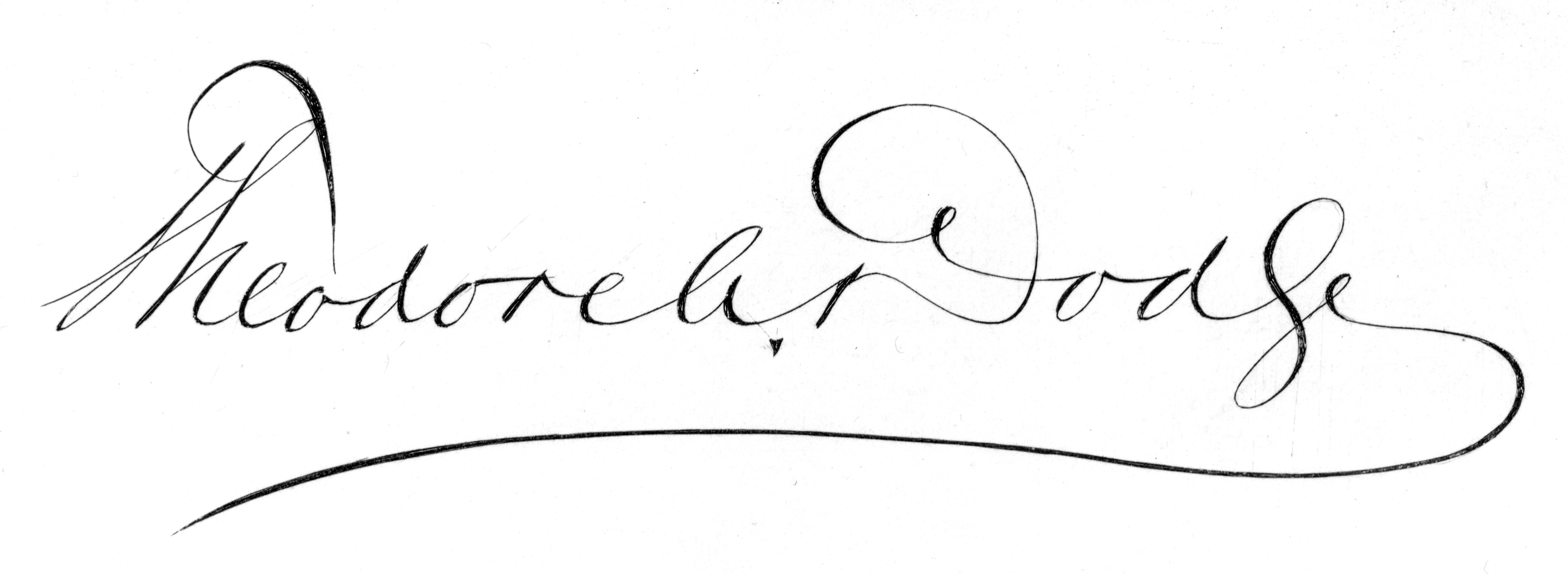

Theodore Ayrault Dodge (May 28, 1842 – October 26, 1909) was an American officer, military historian, and businessman. He fought as a Union officer in the American Civil War; as a writer, he was devoted to both the Civil War and the great generals of ancient and European history.

== Early life ==
Born in Pittsfield, Massachusetts, he received a military education in Berlin and attended University College London and the University of Heidelberg. Returning to the United States in 1861, he promptly enlisted as a private in the New York volunteer infantry. Over the course of the Civil War, he rose to the rank of brevet lieutenant-colonel, losing the lower portion of his right leg at the Battle of Gettysburg. He served at the War Department from 1864 and was commissioned in the regular army in 1866. In 1870, he retired with the rank of major, after which he lived in Boston.

== Retirement and death ==
He invested in various enterprises to manufacture hydraulic hoses, but they failed. Based on a novel tubular loom invented by James E. Gillespie and Robert Cowen, he founded the Boston Woven Hose and Rubber Company in 1884. He later moved to Paris, where he died. He was buried at Arlington National Cemetery, Arlington, Virginia.

== Literary career ==
His works on the Civil War include The Campaign of Chancellorsville (1881) and Bird's Eye View of the Civil War (1883). From 1890 to 1907, he also published twelve volumes of his History of the Art of War: Alexander, Hannibal, Caesar, Gustavus Adolphus, Frederick the Great, Napoleon, although the volumes on Frederick the Great were not completed before his death. The work has been broken up into individual biographies for modern publication. In addition, his military journal, covering his time with the Army of the Potomac from the Seven Days Battles to Gettysburg, has recently been compiled and published by noted historian Stephen W. Sears under the title On Campaign with the Army of the Potomac: The Civil War Journal of Theodore Ayrault Dodge.

== Selected works ==
- Napoleon: A history of the art of war, from the beginning of the peninsular war to the end of the Russian campaign, with a detailed account of the Napoleonic Wars. Riverside Press. 1907. OCLC 779980020.
- Alexander: a history of the origin and growth of the art of war from the earliest times to the Battle of Ipsus, 301 BC, with a detailed account of the campaigns of the great Macedonian. Stackpole Books. 1994. ISBN 1-853-67178-9. OCLC 30155995. Originally published: Boston : Houghton, Mifflin, 1890.
- Caesar: a history of the art of war among the Romans down to the end of the Roman empire, with a detailed account of the campaigns of Caius Julius Caesar. Stackpole Books. 1995. ISBN 1-853-67216-5. OCLC 32391132.Originally published: New York : Houghton, Mifflin and company, 1892.
- Riders of Many Lands, Illustrated by Frederic Remington. Harper and Brothers Publishers, New York. 1894. OCLC 1482694.
- Gustavus Adolphus: a history of the art of war from its revival after the Middle Ages to the end of the Spanish Succession War, with a detailed account of the campaigns of the great Swede, and of the most famous campaigns of Turenne, Condé, Eugene and Marlborough. Stackpole Books. 1996. ISBN 1-853-67234-3. OCLC 33899011. Originally published: Boston : Houghton, Mifflin, 1895.
