= Wenchang Temple =

Wenchang Temple is a common name given to temples dedicated to Wenchang Wang, the Chinese deity of culture and literature. Temples with the name include:

- Beitun Wenchang Temple in Beitun District, Taichung, Taiwan
- Miaoli Wenchang Temple in Miaoli City, Miaoli County, Taiwan
- Jhen Wen Academy, formerly known as Wenchang Temple, in Xiluo Township, Yunlin County, Taiwan

== See also ==
- Wen Chang (disambiguation)
