= Wen Chang =

Wen Chang, Wen-chang, Wenchang, or variation, may refer to:

== Places ==
- Wenchang (Chinese: 文昌) a county-level city in Hainan, China
- Wenchang Village (Chinese: 文昌里), Ren-ai District, Keelung, Taiwan
- 216343 Wenchang, the asteroid Wen Chang, the 216343th minor planet registered
- Wén Chāng (Chinese: 文昌; lit. 'Administrative Center'), a constellation in Chinese astronomy, found in the Purple Forbidden enclosure
- Wenchang Subdistrict (disambiguation), the subdistrict of Wenchang, the name of several subdistricts in China

=== Facilities and structures ===
- Wenchang Spacecraft Launch Site, Wenchang, Hainan, China
- Wenchang railway station, Wenchang, Hainan, China
- Beitun Wenchang Temple, temple in Beitun, Taichung, Taiwan
- Miaoli Wenchang Temple, temple in Miaoli City, Miaoli County, Taiwan
- Jhen Wen Academy, formerly Wen Chang Temple, Xiluo Township, Yunlin County, Taiwan
- Wenchang Pavilion, in the Changchun Confucius Temple, Nanguan, Changchun, Jilin, China
- Wenchang (Chinese: 文昌阁; pinyin: Wén-chāng Gé), a historic place in Niangziguan Town, Pingding, Shanxi, China

== People ==
- Prince of Wenchang (Chinese: 文昌郡王), a title held by the 6th Prince of Yi of Ming dynasty
- Chang Wen-chang (born 1947; Chinese: 張文昌; Wen-chang CHANG), a Taiwanese pharmacologist
- Duan Wenchang (773–835; Chinese: 段文昌; Wen-chang DUAN) the Duke of Zouping
- Ding Wenchang (1933–2022; Chinese: 丁文昌; Wen-chang DING) a general of the People's Liberation Army Air Force
- Hong Wen-chang (1927–2010; Chinese: 洪文昌; Wen-chang HONG), the stage name of Taiwanese singer Ang It-hong
- Song Wen-chang (Chinese: 宋文城; Wen-chang SONG), Taiwanese ambassador to Kiribati; see List of ambassadors of China to Kiribati
- Tse Wen Chang (born 1947; Chinese: 張子文; Tse Wen CHANG) a Taiwanese immunologist
- Xu Wenchang (1521–1593; Chinese: 徐文長; Wen-chang XU) a Ming Dynasty artist
- Yen Wen-chang (born 1947; Chinese: 顏文章; Wen-chang YEN) a Taiwanese politician
- Lawrence Zhang Wen-Chang (1920–2012; Wen-Chang ZHANG / Lawrence ZHANG) a Chinese Roman Catholic priest

=== Religious ===
- Wenchang Wang (Chinese: 文昌王; lit. 'King Wen-chang'), a Chinese Deity; the God of Culture and Literature

=== Fictional characters ===
- Zhao Wenchang (Wen-chang ZHAO), a fictional character from the 2009 Chinese TV show Chinese: 仙剑奇侠传三; pinyin: Xiānjiàn Qí Xiá Chuán Sān, Chinese Paladin 3 (TV series)

== Other uses ==
- Wenchang dialect, a subdialect of Hainanese, itself a dialect of Chinese
- wénchǎng (Chinese: 文场), an element of religion in China

== See also ==
- Wencheng (disambiguation)
- Changwen (disambiguation)
- Chang (disambiguation)
- Wen (disambiguation)
