= Wenchang Subdistrict =

Wenchang Subdistrict (Chinese: 文昌街道; pinyin: Wénchāng Jiēdào) may refer to the following subdistricts in China:

- Wencheng Subdistrict, Fuzhou, a subdistrict of Linchuan District, Fuzhou, Jiangxi
- Wencheng Subdistrict, Jinan, a subdistrict of Changqing District, Jinan, Shangdong
- Wenchang Subdistrict, Tianjin, a subdistrict of Jizhou District, Tianjin
- Wencheng Subdistrict, Tongcheng, a subdistrict of Tongcheng, Anqing, Anhui
- Wencheng Subdistrict, Zhoukou, a subdistrict of Chuanhui District, Zhoukou, Henan
- Wenchang, Dongkou, a subdistrict of Dongkou County, Hunan

== See also ==
- Wenchang (disambiguation)
- Wencheng (disambiguation)
