= Changwen =

Changwen may refer to:

- Changwon (Korean: 창원시; Yale: Changwen), Gyeongsangnam-do, South Korea
- Chen Qun (died 237; courtesy name: Changwen, Chinese: 長文; pinyin: Zhǎngwén), Three Kingdoms Era politician of Cao Wei
- Cheng Changwen (Chinese: 程長文; pinyin: Chéng Zhǎngwén), Tang Dynasty poet
- Chen Changwen (born 1944; simplified Chinese: 陈长文; traditional Chinese: 陳長文; pinyin: Chén Chángwén), Chinese politician
- Liú Chàngwén, Miss China International 2008, see China at major beauty pageants
- Miao Changwen (缪昌文), a male Han Chinese politician for Jiangsu at the 11th National People's Congress; see List of members of the 11th National People's Congress
- Chang Wen (張文), Perpetrator at 2025 Taipei stabbings

== See also ==
- Wenchang (disambiguation)
- Chang (disambiguation)
- Wen (disambiguation)
