= Xuefeng (disambiguation) =

Xuefeng may refer to:

- Xuefeng Mountains, a mountain range in western Hunan, China

== Township-level divisions in China ==
- Xuefeng, a subdistrict of Dongkou County in Hunan.
- Xuefeng Town, a town of Hongjiang City in Hunan.

== Chinese names ==
- Xue Feng
