= Wen Tian =

Wen Tian or Wentian or variation, may refer to:

== Space station module ==
- Wentian module (simplified Chinese: 问天; traditional Chinese: 問天; pinyin: Wèn Tiān), a laboratory module for the Chinese Space Station

== Places ==
- Wentian (town) (simplified Chinese: 文田镇; traditional Chinese: 文田鎮; pinyin: Wén Tián Zhèn), Xinhua County, Hunan Province, People's Republic of China.

== People ==
Given name
Wen-Tian

- Wentian Li, bioinformatician
- Liu Wentian (Chinese: 刘文天; pinyin: Liú Wén-Tiān), a contestant on 2016 Sing! China (season 1)
- Zhang Wentian (simplified Chinese: 张闻天; traditional Chinese: 張聞天; pinyin: Zhāng Wén-Tiān; Wade–Giles: Chang Wen-tien; 1900-1976), General Secretary of the Chinese Communist Party

Name
TIAN, Wen

- Lord Mengchang (died 279BCE), personal name Wen Tian (Chinese: 田文; pinyin: Tián Wén)

=== Fictional characters ===
Given name
Wen-Tian

- Prince Wentian, a character from the 2002 Mandarin-language wuxia TV series Chinese: 大醉俠; pinyin: Dà Zuì Xiá; Drunken Hero
- Nangong Wentian, a fictional character from the Hong Kong wuxia comic book 神兵玄奇; Weapons of the Gods (comics)
- Xiang Wentian (simplified Chinese: 向问天; traditional Chinese: 向問天; pinyin: Xiàng Wèn-Tiān; Jyutping: Hoeng Man-Tin), a character from the 1969 Jin Yong wuxia novel The Smiling, Proud Wanderer (Chinese: 笑傲江湖; pinyin: Xiào Ào Jiāng Hú; Jyutping: Siu3 Ngou6 Gong1 Wu4)
- Xiang Wentian, a fictional character from the 1992 Hong Kong wuxia film Swordsman II

Name
WEN, Tian

- Wen Tian, a character from the Tang Qi Gong Zi (唐七公子) 2012 novel (三生三世枕上书) Three Lives Three Worlds, The Pillow Book

== See also ==
- Tian Wen (disambiguation)
- Tianwen (disambiguation)
- Tian (disambiguation)
- Wen (disambiguation)
