= Kuixu Library =

Library in Shandong Province, China

Coordinates: 36.67264°N 117.01521°E

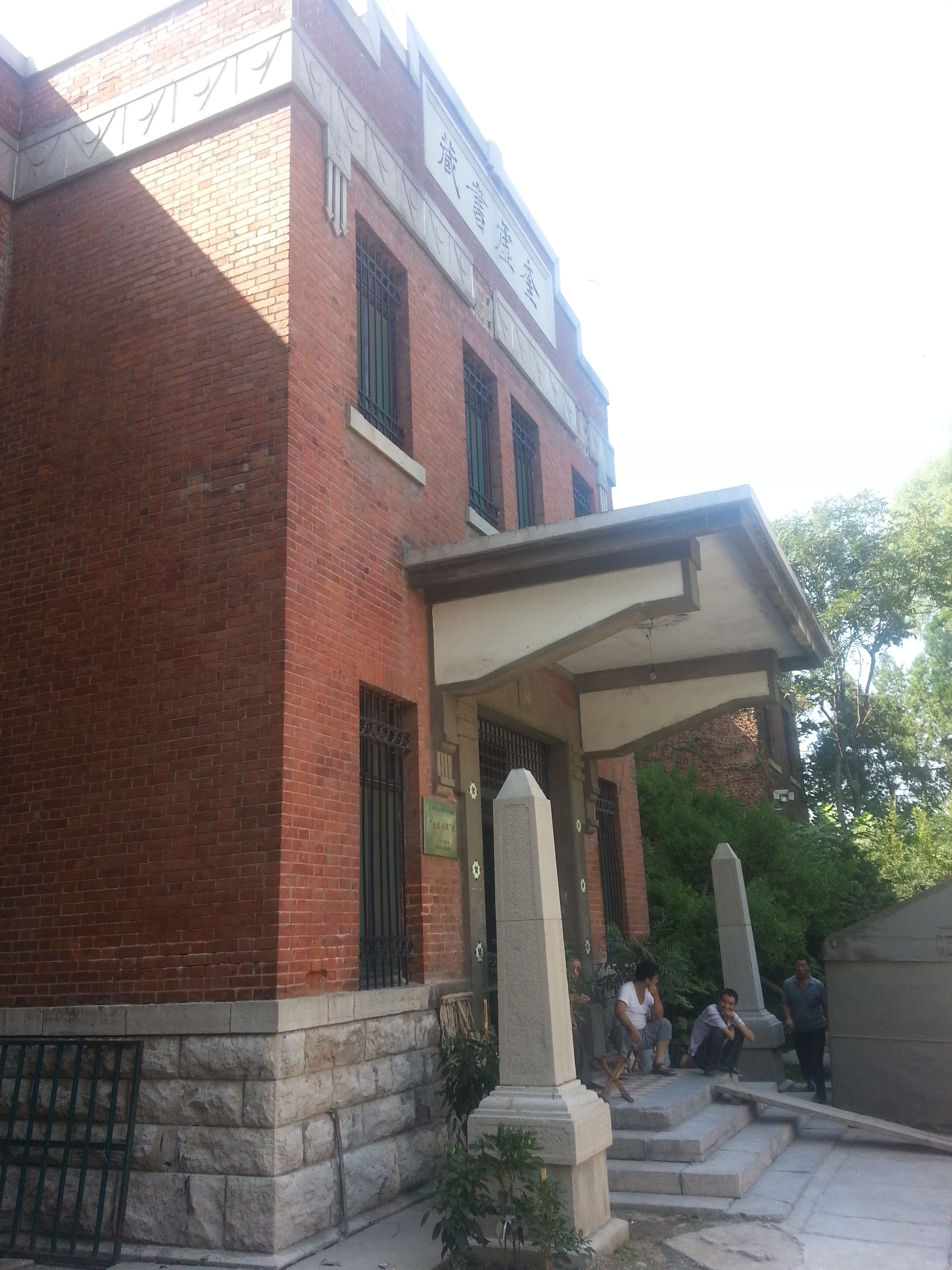
Kuixu Library

The Kuixu Library (Chinese: 奎虚书藏; pinyin: Kuíxū Shūcáng) is a historical building of the Shandong Provincial Library in Jinan, the capital of Shandong Province, China.

== Name ==
The Kuixu Library is named after the Kui star (Chinese: 魁星; pinyin: kuí xīng) that represents the state of Qi and the Xu star (Chinese: 虚星; pinyin: xū xīng) that represents the state of Lu. Both of these historical states together ("Qilu") are taken to represent Shandong.

== History ==
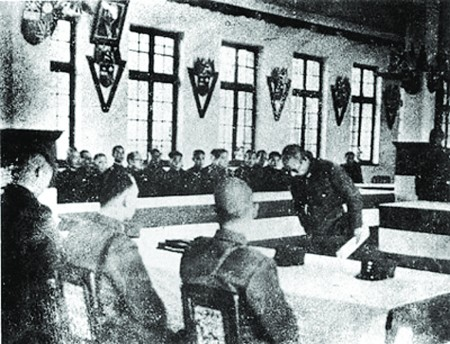
Surrender of the Japanese troops in Shandong, December 1945.

The first Shandong provincial library was founded in 1909 in a traditional courtyard garden on the western shore of the Daming Lake and was modelled after the Tianyi Pavilion in Ningbo, China's oldest existing private library. The library was severely damaged during the Jinan Incident of 1928 due to its proximity to the headquarters of the Nationalist Party in Jinan. Since the provincial library's holdings had been outgrowing the remaining capacity of the old damaged library since 1929, the Kuixu Library was constructed in 1934 as the library's new main building with a grant of 50,000 Yuan from the provincial government. On December 27, 1945, the Kuixu Library became the site of the surrender ceremony for the Japanese troops in Shandong. In 1984, a new building was completed for the Shandong provincial library on the east second ring road. The Kuixu Library was renovated in 2004. It has been listed as a major historical and cultural site protected by Shandong Province since 2006 (site number 3-269).

== Location ==
The Kuixu Library is located on the south western shore of Daming Lake.

== See also ==
- Major historical and cultural sites protected by Shandong Province
