= Tian Wen =

Tian Wen can refer to:

- Lord Mengchang (died 279 BCE), personal name Tian Wen, aristocrat and statesman of the Qi Kingdom of ancient China
- Heavenly Questions (simplified Chinese: 天问; traditional Chinese: 天問; pinyin: Tiānwèn), section of the Classical Chinese poetry work Chuci
- Tian-Wen, Miluo (天问街道), a subdistrict in Miluo City, Hunan province
- See also
- Tianwen (disambiguation)
- Wen Tian (disambiguation)
- Tian (disambiguation)
- Wen (disambiguation)
