= Xiluo (disambiguation) =

Xiluo is an urban township in Yunlin County, Taiwan. Xiluo may also refer to the following places in China:

- Xiluo, Longshan (洗洛乡), a township in Longshan County, Xiangxi Prefecture, Hunan, China
- Xiluo, Shouyang (西洛镇), a town in Shouyang County, Jinzhong, Shanxi, China
