= Miaodao (abbess) =

Chinese Buddhist abbess

Miaodao (Chinese: 妙道, died after 1134) was a Chinese Buddhist abbess and master, lüshi.

She was a daughter of minister Huang Shang (1044–1130) and became a nun at the age of twenty. She was a student of Zhenxie Qinguao in the Caodong school in Xuefeng, and from 1134 at Dahui Zonggao. She became a noted master and respected lecturer within Chan Buddhism, served as abbess in several convents and gave lessons particularly but not exclusively to women. Women played an important part within Chan Buddhism, and Miaodao was contemporary with her female colleague Miaozong.
