= Mon =

Mon, MON or Mon. may refer to:

== Places ==
- Mon State, a subdivision of Myanmar
- Mon, India, a town in Nagaland
- Mon district, Nagaland
- Mon, Raebareli, a village in Uttar Pradesh, India
- Mon, Switzerland, a village in the Canton of Grisons
- Anglesey, Welsh: Môn, an island and county of Wales
- Møn, an island of Denmark
- Monongahela River, US or "The Mon"

== Peoples and languages ==
- Mon people, an ethnic group from Burma
- Mon language, spoken in Burma and Thailand
- Mon–Khmer languages, a large language family of Mainland Southeast Asia
- Mongolian language (ISO 639 code), official language of Mongolia
- Alisa Mon, Russian singer

== Other uses ==
- Mon (emblem), Japanese heraldic symbols
- Mon (architecture), gates at Buddhist temples, Shinto shrines, mansions, and castles in Japan
- Mon (boat), a traditional war canoe of the North Solomons
- Mon (currency), a currency used in Japan until 1870
- Môn FM, a radio station serving Anglesey, Wales
- The Gate (novel) (Mon (門)), a 1910 novel by Natsume Sōseki
- .мон, Internet country code top-level domain for Mongolia

== Abbreviations ==
- Member of the Order of the Niger, national honour
- Ministry of National Defence (Poland) (Ministerstwo Obrony Narodowej)
- Mixed oxides of nitrogen, chemical mixture
- Monaco, IOC country code
- Monarch Airlines (IATA code), a British airline
- Monday, abbreviated Mon.
- Mongolia, UNDP country code
- Monmouthshire (ISO 3166 code GB-MON), a Welsh local government area
- Monmouthshire (historic) (Chapman code), a Welsh historic county
- Monoceros, a constellation
- The category of monoids
- Monon Railroad (reporting mark), a former railroad in Indiana
- Monsanto, NYSE
  - MON 810, a Monsanto genetically modified crop
  - MON 863, a Monsanto genetically modified crop
- Motor octane number, an octane rating for fuel
- Music On! TV, M-On, a Japanese TV channel
- Martin O’Neill, current Celtic F.C. manager

== See also ==
- Mons (disambiguation)
- Japanese mon (disambiguation)
- 文 (disambiguation)
