= Japanese mon =

Japanese mon can refer to:

- Japanese mon (currency) (文), used in Japan until 1870.
- Mon (emblem) (紋), Japanese family heraldic symbols
- The Gate (novel) or Mon (Japanese: 門), a 1910 novel by Natsume Sōseki
- Mon (architecture), one of the gates of a Buddhist temple or Shinto shrine in Japan

== See also ==
- Mon
- 文 (disambiguation)
