= Guangfu =

Guangfu may refer to:

- Guangzhou or Guangfu, the capital of Guangdong, China
- Guangfu Ancient City, a village in Handan, Hebei, China
- Guangfu, Hualien, a township in eastern Taiwan
- Guangfu Road in Taipei, Taiwan
- Guangfu dialect, a family of Cantonese dialects
- Guangfuhui or Guangfu Society, a 20th-century anti-Qing secret society

== See also ==
- Suzhou Guangfu Airport, a military airport in Suzhou, Jiangsu, China
- Xiluo Guangfu Temple in Yunlin County, Taiwan
- retrocession: The pinyin-romanization of Sino-xenic word "光復", can be translated as the word.
