= Xiluo Theater =

Former theater in Xiluo, Yunlin, Taiwan

- 西螺戲院
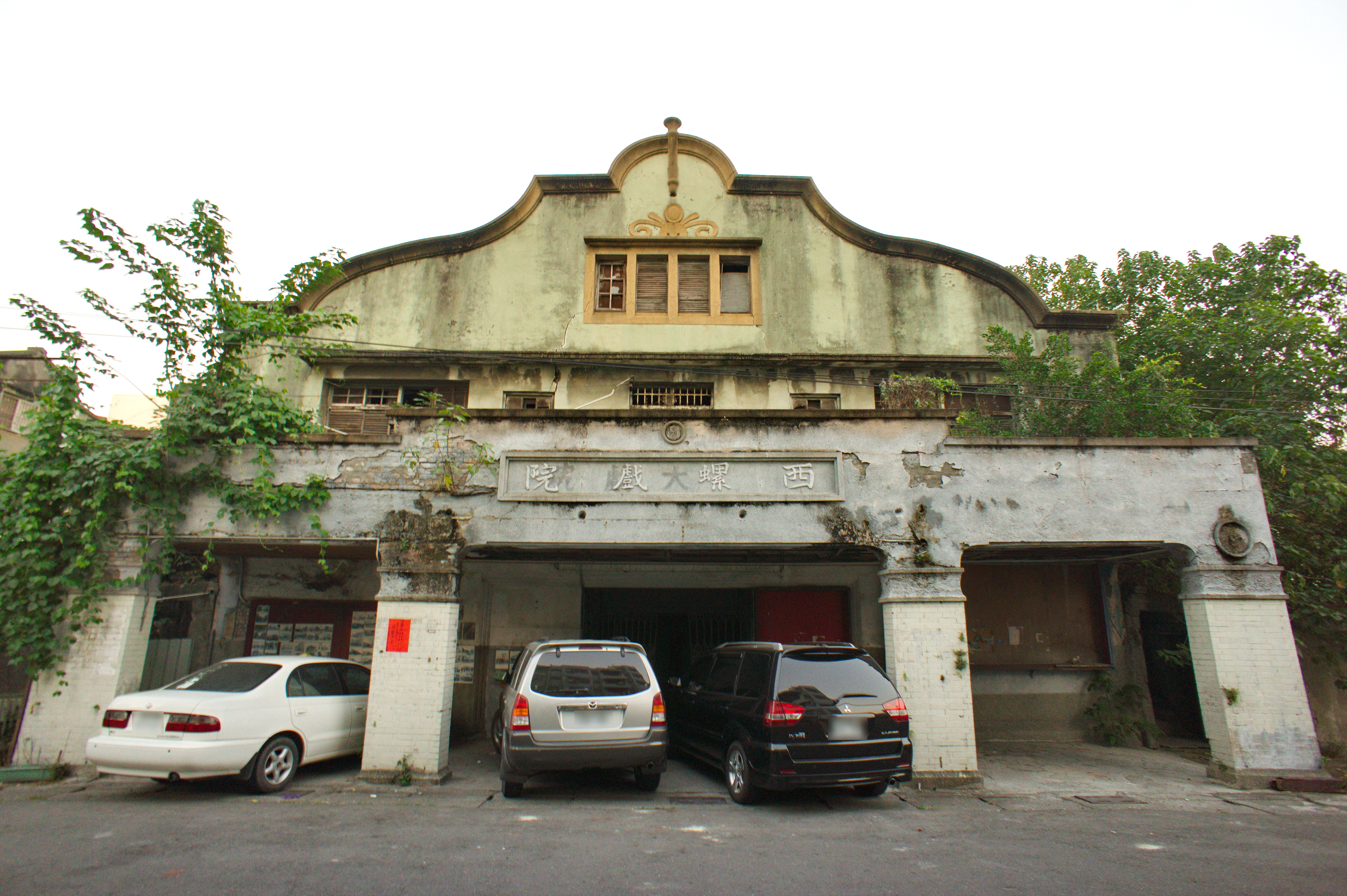
- Interactive map of Xiluo Theater
- Location: Xiluo, Yunlin, Taiwan
- Coordinates: 23°48′04.8″N 120°27′48.4″E
- Seating type: 500
- Type: former theater

Construction
- Built: 1940
- Closed: 1990s

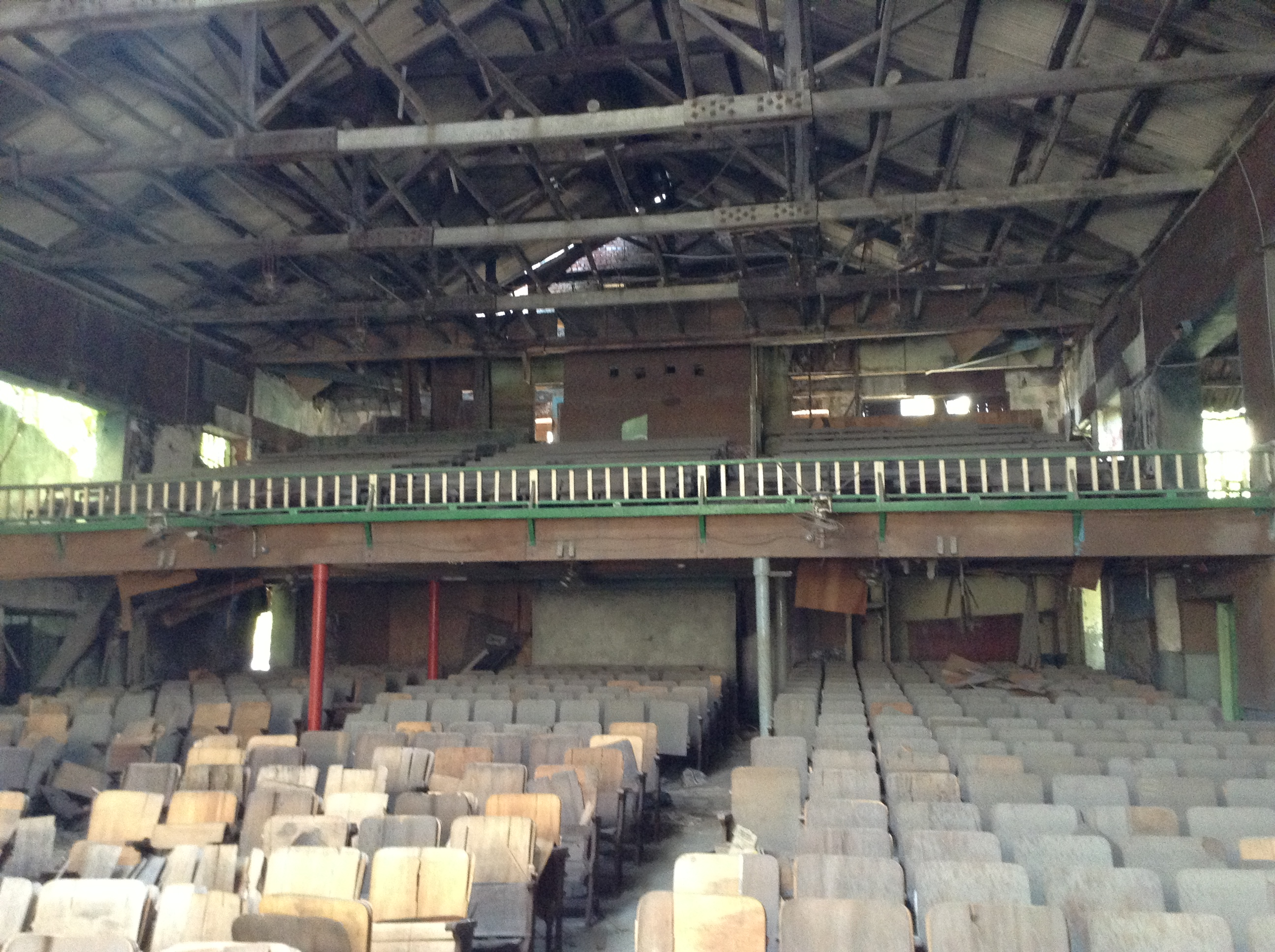
Xiluo Theater interior

The Xiluo Theater (traditional Chinese: 西螺戲院; simplified Chinese: 西螺戏院; pinyin: Xiluó Xìyuàn) is a former theater in Xiluo Township, Yunlin County, Taiwan.

== History ==
The theater building was originally built in 1940 under the name Xiluo Opera House with the funds from the prestigious Lin Guang-he clan. It was then later renamed as Xiluo Old Theater. The theater building was closed in the 1980s. In 2001, the theater was declared a historical building.

== Architecture ==
The appearance of the theater is Baroque architecture in design. The front gable with symmetric arcs is decorated with stucco molding and added with embellishment patterns and tile mosaic. The interior is mostly of Chinese cypress structure. The theater has a grand stage with more than a thousand seating capacity. The theater is a two-story building with seating capacity of 500 people.

== See also ==
- Cinema of Taiwan
