= Liao Hsiao-chun =

Taiwanese TV presenter

- Born: October 19, 1967; Xiluo, Yunlin County, Taiwan
- Notable credit: Hosting TV programs

Liao Hsiao-chun (Chinese: 廖筱君; pinyin: Liào Xiǎojūn; born 19 October 1967 in Xiluo Township, Yunlin County, Taiwan) is a Taiwanese TV presenter. She worked for many television/radio stations, such as TVBS-NEWS, FTV News, TTV, Era News, Voice of Taipei, Super TV and ETTV News. She is most famous for hosting the Chao ji da fu weng game show.

In 2017, Chiu Tai-san, the Taiwanese Justice Minister, threatened Liao with a libel lawsuit. However, Chiu resigned in July 2018, in a cabinet shuffle, which the government denied was meant as "a denial of outgoing Cabinet members", without suing Liao. Chiu had previously been the subject of a libel suit threat himself.

She opened the documentary film Braving the Peak in 2024.
