= Kui Xing =

Chinese deity

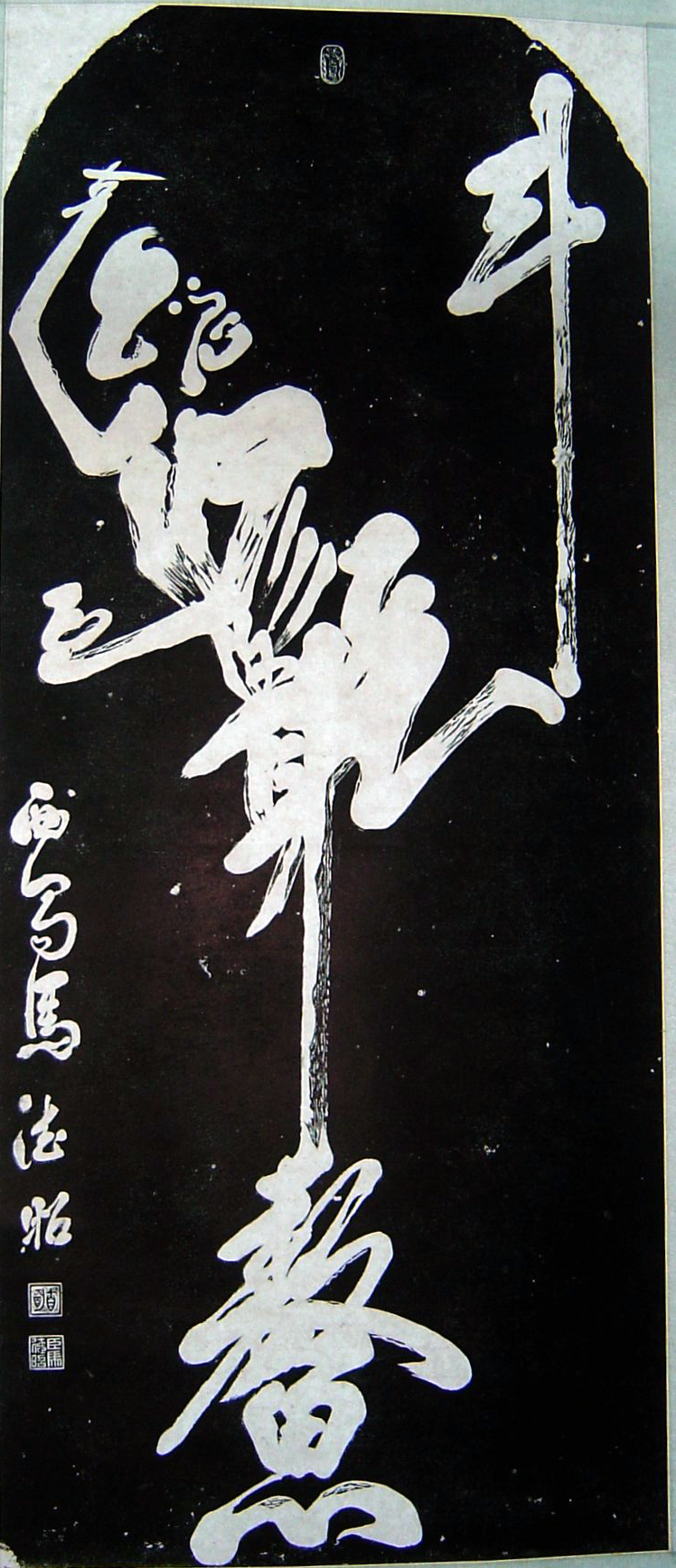
Rubbing of Kui Xing stele (with the 鰲 ao turtle and a 斗 ladle) at Stele Forest Museum in Xi'an.

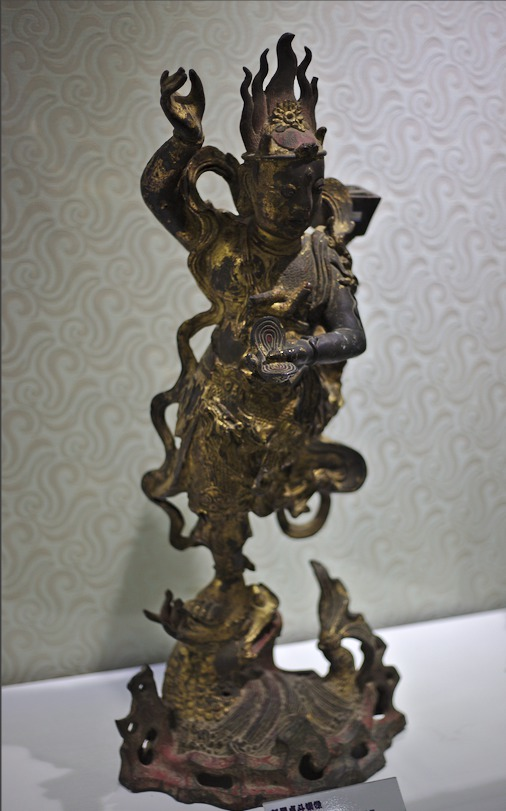
Bronze statue of Kui Xing, late Ming Dynasty.

Kuixing, or Kui Xing, is translated as "Chief Star" and is the deification of the Pole Star. He is said to be the helper of Wenchang Wang, the deification of Ursa Major. According to the Grand Historian and Astronomer Sima Qian, Chinese astronomers used Ursa Major, or the Big Dipper, to find the Pole Star which points due north and is part of the handle of Ursa Minor, or the Little Dipper, "ever since people had existed." He is known as the God of Examinations and in earlier Chinese history was given offerings by students hoping to perform well on the Imperial Civil Service exams. This tradition continues today as students seeking help with their tests give incense, prayers, or leave offerings of food to Kui Xing at temples of Wenchang Wang.

== Folk beliefs ==
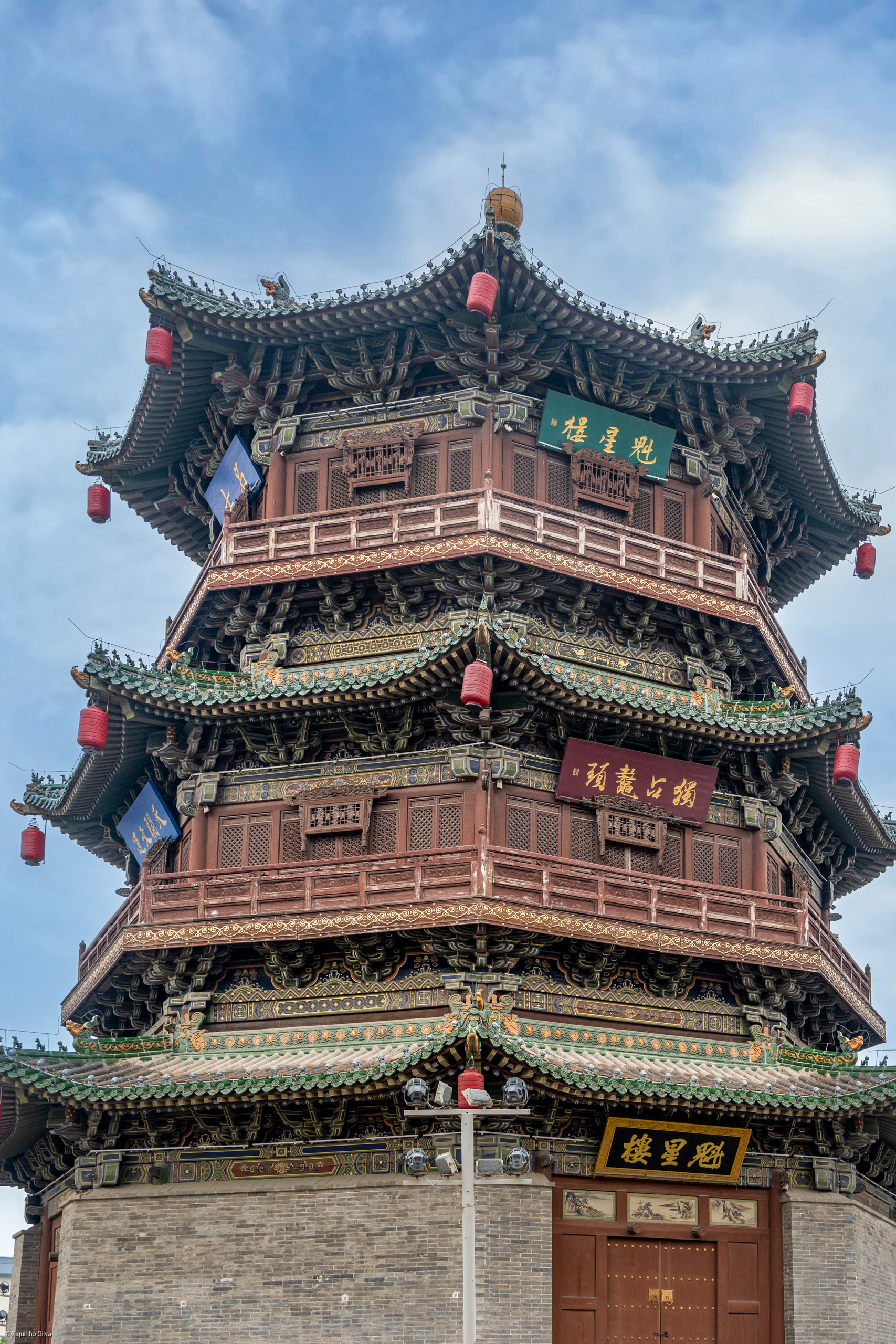
The Datong Kuixing Pavilion, Shanxi

In Daoist tradition, Kui Xing is said to have been "bent and hunchbacked, as if he were an actual calligraphy character", and came to be viewed as a saint of human fortune, particularly with regard to imperial examinations. He is the personification of the Pole star which in Daoist tradition was said to split Yin and Yang,

Late Ming Dynasty scholar Gu Yan-Wu, often referred to as Gu Ting-Lin, wrote of Kui Xing in his Records of Daily[-gained] Knowledge (日知錄): "The date of the beginning of modern people's veneration of Kui Xing is unknown. Since Kui (奎) was taken to be the master of composition, therefore the people established shrines to venerate him. Being unable to sculpt an image of the star (奎), his name was thus changed to [the homophonous character] 魁. Again being unable to directly construct an image of 魁, the character was split into its constituent radicals [鬼 Gui - Ghost/Spirit and 斗 Dou - Ladle/Gourd] and illustrated as such."

As his form developed, people depicted Kui Xing's right foot standing on a character 鰲 (ao), a giant turtle, in reference to a traditional saying, 獨佔鰲頭, "to stand lonely on the ao's head", meaning coming in first in examinations), his left foot supports an inkpot, a writing brush in his hand, and his body full of vigor and life. Stylized calligraphy of Confucian adages often compose his torso.

Artists have also depicted the ao on which Kui Xing stands as a giant fish (see the image of a temple in Xinwupu, Hubei), or as a realistic-looking turtle (e.g., the statue near Bijiacheng - the "Brush-rest wall" - in Changde, Hunan).

== See also ==
- Beitun Wenchang Temple
- Miaoli Wenchang Temple
- Imperial examination in Chinese mythology
- Legs (Chinese constellation)
