= Wencheng =

Wencheng or Wen Cheng or variation (Wade–Giles: Wen-ch'eng), may refer to:

== People ==
- Emperor Wencheng of Northern Wei (440-465)
- Princess Wencheng, Chinese princess who married King Songtsen Gampo of Tibet

== Places ==
- Wencheng County (文成县), a county in Wenzhou, Zhejiang, China
  - Wencheng dialect
- Wencheng, Hainan (文城镇), a town in Wenchang, Hainan, China
- Wencheng, Jiangxi (文成镇), a town in Yushan County, Jiangxi, China
- Wencheng, Sichuan (文成镇), a town in Langzhong, Sichuan, China
- Wencheng Township, Hebei (温城乡), in Jing County, Hebei, China
- Wencheng Township, Henan (文城乡), in Suiping County, Henan, China
- Wencheng Township, Shanxi (文城乡), in Ji County, Shanxi, China

== See also ==
- Wenchang (disambiguation)
- Cheng (disambiguation)
- Wen (disambiguation)
