= Chung Jen-pi =

Taiwanese puppeteer (1932–2021)

Chung Jen-pi (鍾任壁 pinyin: Zhong Renbi; 1932 – 5 September 2021) was a well-known potehi puppeteer from Xiluo, the fifth-generation head of Hsin Shing Kuo Puppet Show Troupe 新興閣掌中劇團, which was founded in the late nineteenth century. The son of famous puppeteer Chung Jen-hsiang 鍾任祥, he taught and performed for decades.
