= Huagu Subdistrict =

Subdistrict of Dongkou County in Hunan, China

Coordinates: 27°1′55″N 110°34′15″E

Huagu Subdistrict (Chinese: 花古街道; pinyin: Huāgǔ Jiēdào) is a subdistrict of Dongkou County in Hunan, China. It was one of three subdistricts established in July 2015. The subdistrict has an area of 46.5 km^{2} (18.0 sq mi) with a population of 63,000 (as of 2015). The subdistrict of Huagu has 9 villages and a community under its jurisdiction.

== History ==
The former Huagu Township (Chinese: 花古乡) was reorganized as a subdistrict in July 2015.

== Subdivisions ==
The subdistrict of Huagu has a community and 9 villages under its jurisdiction.

a community

- Liyuan Community (Chinese: 梨园社区)

9 villages

- Changlong Village (Chinese: 长龙村)
- Chengnan Village (Chinese: 城南村)
- Huagu Village (Chinese: 花古村)
- Huishui Village (Chinese: 洄水村)
- Jiangnan Village (Chinese: 江南村)
- Qili Village (Chinese: 七里村)
- Tianjia Village (Chinese: 田家村)
- Yuelong Village (Chinese: 跃龙村)
- Zhenglong Village (Chinese: 正龙村)
