= Tianwen (disambiguation) =

Tianwen is a Classical Chinese poem known in English as the Heavenly Questions.

Tianwen may also refer to:

- Tianwen-1, a 2020 Chinese space mission to Mars
- Tianwen-2, a 2025 Chinese asteroid sample-return mission
- Tianwen-3, a planned Chinese Mars sample-return mission
- Tianwen-4, a planned Chinese space mission to Jupiter and Uranus
- Tianwen, Miluo (天问街道), a subdistrict in Miluo City, Hunan province

== See also ==
- Tian Wen (disambiguation)
- Wentian (disambiguation)
