= Imperial examination in Chinese mythology =

Civil service examination system in myth

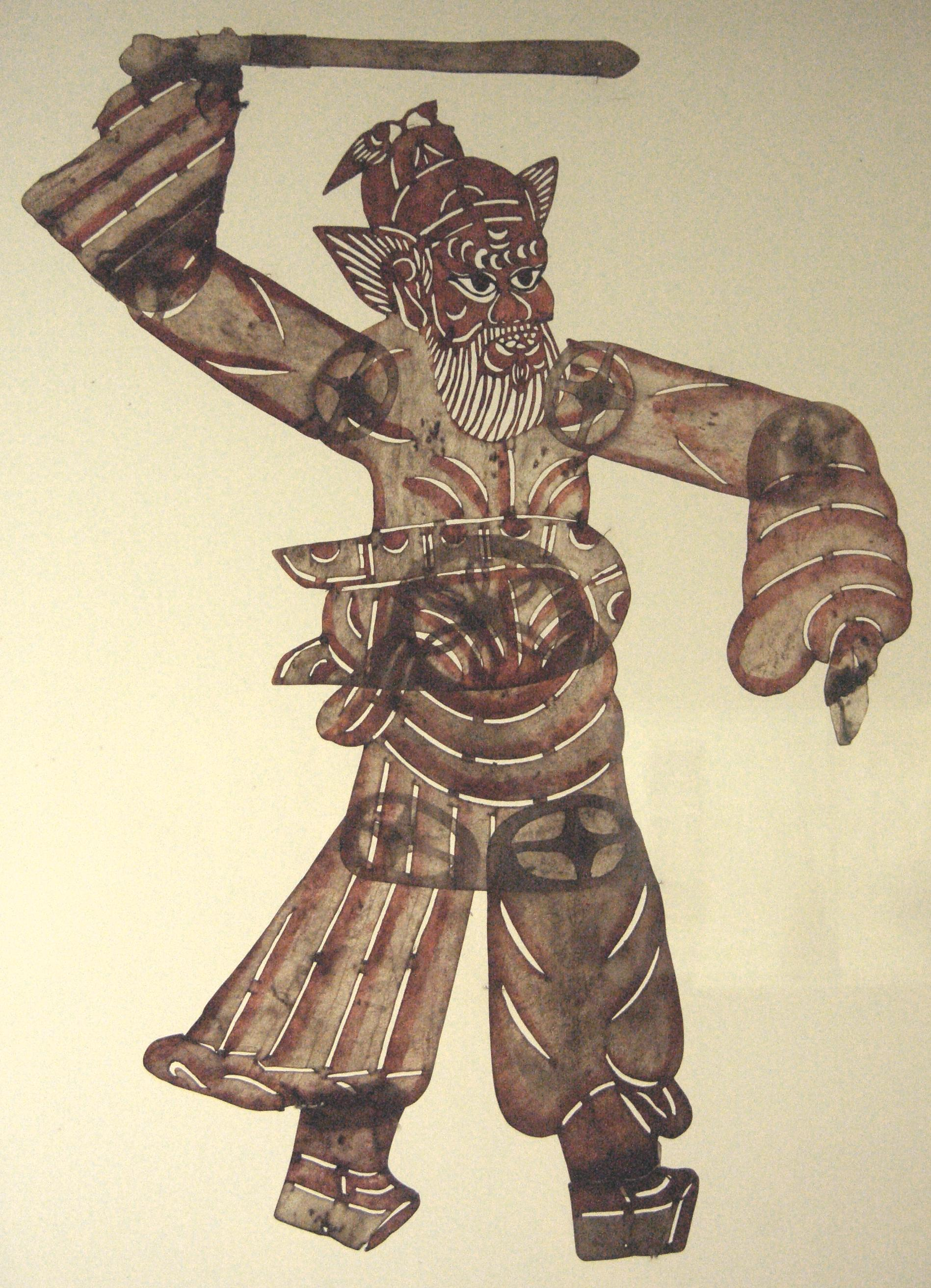
Zhong Kui, as used for depiction on the screen of a shadow play. Qing dynasty.

The imperial examination was a civil service examination system in Imperial China designed to select the most promising candidates for administrative roles, with the aim of recruiting them into the state bureaucracy. Its purpose of testing and selecting candidates for merit significantly influenced various aspects of society and culture in Imperial China, including Chinese mythology.

The imperial civil service examinations were designed as objective measures to evaluate the educational attainment and merit of the examinees, as part of the process by which to make selections and appointments to various offices within the structure of the government of the Chinese empire, or, sometimes, during periods of Chinese national disunion, of offices within the various states. During more recent historical times, successful candidates could receive the jinshi (chin-shih), and other degrees, generally followed by assignment to specific offices, with higher level degrees and competitive ranking within the degrees tending to lead to higher ranking placements in the imperial government service. The examination system developed largely in response to religious and philosophical ideas about ideal social order. Also, traditional Chinese religion and philosophy responded to concerns about the examination system. Both processes were intimately bound together with a literary system and other traditions which had a relative continuity of several thousand years. The actual examination process developed together with various related philosophical, religious, and narrative concepts to produce a distinct mythological motif.

== Sacred origins ==
A common mythological motif provides a religious type of sacredness to later social institutions by projecting their origins back to a time when deities and culture heroes were credited with having divinely or miraculously created them, thus giving them an aura of greater-than-human qualities, and a justification for their existence and structural qualities with an implication that these are things which mere mortals should not question (as well as avoiding giving credit for their institution to a preceding rival dynasty). This applies particularly to the Chinese system of examinations to recruit government officials and to the related institutions of governmentally sponsored and controlled education.

== Origin myth: Shun's succession ==
The first instance tantamount to an idea of imperial examination is mentioned in the Shang shu ("Yao dian" 堯典), long before a whole bureaucracy of testing was developed. The text describes Emperor Yao's intent of examining abilities of his successor. Yao, one of the Three Sovereigns and Five Emperors (traditional dates of rule approximately 2852-2070 BC), saw commencement of the Great Flood. As he grew old in age, the Emperor Yao perceived that he would not live long enough to see the end of the flood. Therefore, he began to seek a successor, someone worthy enough and capable enough to rescue the people from this great calamity. Yao did not turn to the patriarchal system of choosing one of his sons. Yao wished to find the most talented and worthy person in the kingdom. Yao offered his throne to Four Mountains, but Four Mountains declined. Instead, they recommended Shun. At the time, Shun is said to have been at home displaying filial piety. Despite this evidence of his virtue, and the recommendation of Four Mountains, Yao decided that in order to recruit a replacement for the highest of the civil service offices, that of emperor himself, it would only be prudent to instigate a series of tests. The tests included marrying Shun to his two daughters, Fairy Radiance (Ehuang) and Maiden Bloom (Nüying), to see whether Shun could maintain family harmony at home, and ended by sending him down from the mountains to the plains below where Shun had to face fierce winds, thunder, and rain during the course of some test of unexplained mystery. Candidate Shun successfully passed this series of imperial examinations and was recruited as emperor, serving, it is said, as co-emperor, until the death of Yao. Shun and Yao both became mythological cultural heroes, due, in part, to their fight against the flood, and helping the people to lead better lives. The story of how Yao chose Shun by seeking and testing for the most virtuous and meritorious person in the whole empire became a mainstay of Confucian discourse, with Yao and Shun being glorified as epitomes of virtue. A likewise pattern, glorifying merit on the expense of the family ties, is described in succession of Shun by Yu the Great. Also, in later mythology and folk religion, the stories of the examinations of the dead in Heaven or Hell show certain parallels, in the way Chinese folk religion typically depicts the non-mundane world and the world of humans to mirror each other.

== Triennial examination tradition ==
Shun is also credited with a universal gathering of his nobles and subjecting them to imperial examination every 3 years, in order to decide about promotions, demotions, or retaining of the current status in the governance structure.

== Music Bureau ==
During the later dynastic history of China, there existed a government Music Bureau (most notably during a certain part of the Han dynasty, during the Tang dynasty, and perhaps similarly in the Qin dynasty): this was an institution involving the setting of standards and competitive evaluations thereby. In mythology, this involves one of the motifs which provide a religious-type of sacrality to the institution. The Music Bureau or Ministry of Music was actually not a music academy in the modern sense: its function included the collection and composition of music and poetry for royal court functions of entertainment and religious rites, but its functionality was much more. The tradition behind the Shijing poetry anthology was that the reason that poems (and presumably accompanying musical scores and choreography, now lost) were collected, polished, and brought to court for presentation to the emperor, was to inform him of the thoughts, feelings, and conditions of the various peoples in different parts of the empire. That tradition that Confucius himself served as the editor-in-chief of the Shijing provided great prestige to this concept, together with several explicit comments commending the results in the Confucian classics. The Han dynasty Music Bureau was also explicitly avowed to serve a similar function. This was not the only educational function attributed to the Music Bureau: even going back to the early mythological tradition, the original Ministry of Music was founded by Emperor Shun, in order to teach propriety and harmony to his heirs apparent and others. Thus, a certain moral function was built into the tradition from its origins.

In mythology, the original Ministry of Music was founded by Emperor Shun, in order to teach propriety and harmony to his heirs apparent. Thus, the mythological foundation (sometimes considered to be the legendary historical foundation) of the Chinese educational system) and the original archetype later cited by scholar-officials responsible in historical times for public administration institutional design was told in the story of Shun, and how he arranged his government, including a Music Ministry. The work of the Music Bureau was eventually incorporated into the testing curriculum of the imperial examination system.

== Zhou selection of the worthy and the capable ==
Much of the literary phenomena associated with Zhou dynasty is a historically proven fact, as are this dynasty. However, some of the Zhou material is factual, some is known to be mythological, and sometimes the two are hard to separate. The rites and records known from the Zhou era do include a prototypical imperial examination system.

=== Myth versus history ===
Traditional Chinese-source scholarship regarding ancient China typically involves a dual tradition: a historicizing tradition that results in scholarship such as K. C. Wu's, which removes the unicorns from the writings of Confucius by implying that this was merely an artifact of his final senile descent towards death, saying that when this prime example of a mythological beast appeared in the works of Confucius, it caused him to "lay down his pen and write no more" and that "[h]e died two years later" (Wu, 6); and to go on to similarly strip other mythological elements out of the ancient writings in order to provide a history of the rise of the Zhou dynasty which lacks much from the preserved accounts (that is, it preserves the historical—especially that confirmed by the oracle bones and other archeology—and rejects the embedded mythology); and, also there is the mythologizing and popular culture versions such as that the Ji family that founded the Zhou dynasty was the result of Jiang Yuan's supernatural conception of Houji or the Fengshen Yanyi version that allows the rise of Zhou to revolve around the interactions of the goddess Nüwa, a fox spirit with nine tails that is a thousand years old, a nine-headed pheasant, a jade pipa (a musical instrument capable of assuming human form), and so on. King Wen of Zhou (the name and title "king", wang, were posthumously conferred) was also known as the Literate Duke of Zhou, and he is credited in the dual tradition as the founder of many Chinese institutions, including the Biyong academy with a teaching staff of 3 elders plus 5 various others and a system of universal recruitment into service based upon merit which involved examinations, posthumously regarded as "imperial".

== Confucian rationalism ==
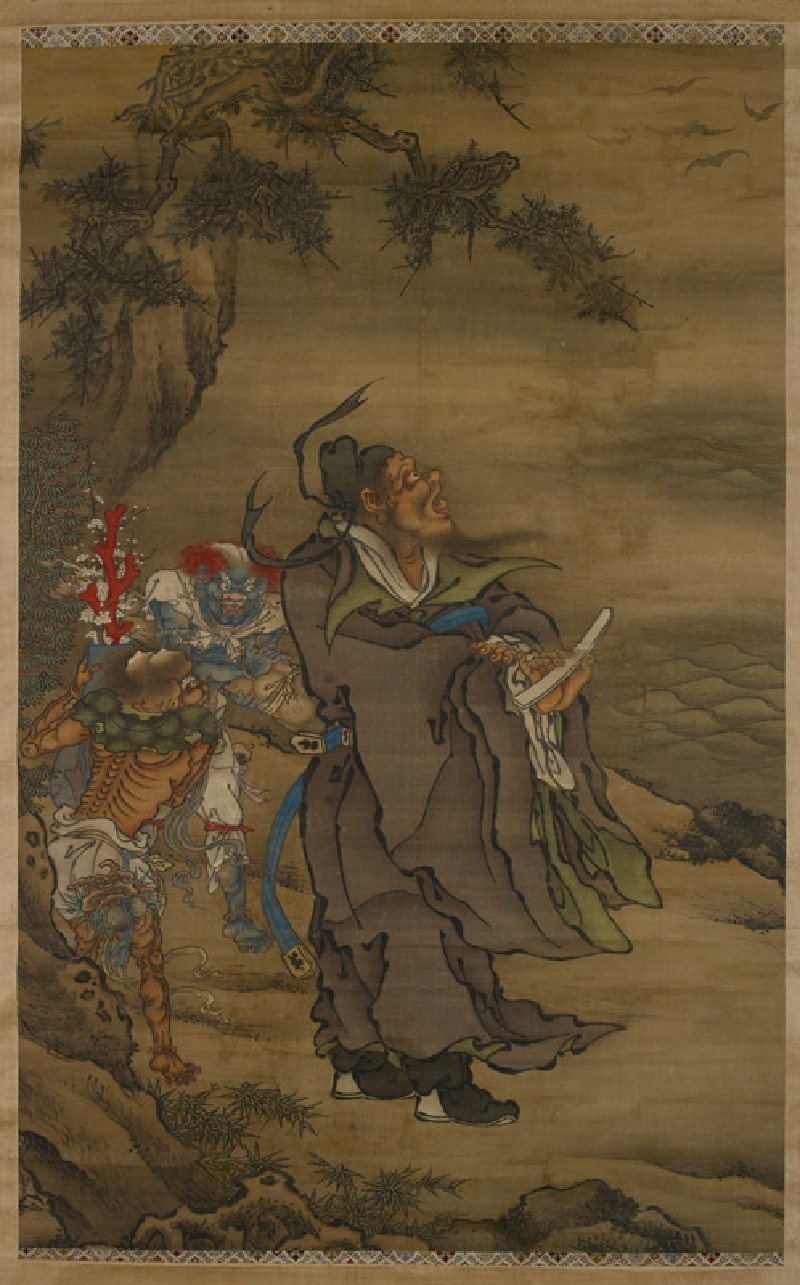
Zhong Kui the Demon Queller with Five Bats

From a certain viewpoint, the examination system represented the most rationalistic aspect of the Confucian system. The system of testing was designed according to the principle of a society ruled by men of merit, and to achieve this by objectively measuring knowledge and intelligence of vatious candidates. However, in actual operation, the system also had aspects of religious and irrational beliefs more complex than this (Yang, C. K., 265–266). The idea of Fate is a mythological motif which had a significant role in the cultural context of the examination system involving cosmic forces which predestine certain results of human affairs: particularly that individual success or failure is subject to the will of Heaven, and that the results of taking the imperial examinations could be influenced by the intervention of various deities.

== Zhong Kui ==
Zhong Kui, also spelled Chung-kuei, was a deity associated with the examination system, who achieved a major posthumous promotion during the Tang dynasty. The story is that a certain scholar took the tests, and, despite his most excellent performance, which should have won him first place, he was unfairly deprived of the first place prize by a corrupt official: in response, the scholar killed himself, the act of suicide condemning him to be a ghost. The Yanluo Wang was impressed of his strong character, and he became a powerful Deity who vanquished evil spirits. Many people afraid of traveling on roads and paths that may be haunted by evil spirits have worshiped Zhong Kui as an efficacious protective deity.

== Naming taboo ==
Some individuals were discriminated against because of their names, due to a naming taboo. For example, because the Tang dynasty poet Li He's father's name sounded like the jin, in jinshi, he was discouraged from taking the tests (Hinton, 286). The claim was that if Li He was called a jinshi, it would be against the rule of etiquette that a son not be called by his father's name.

== Symbology ==
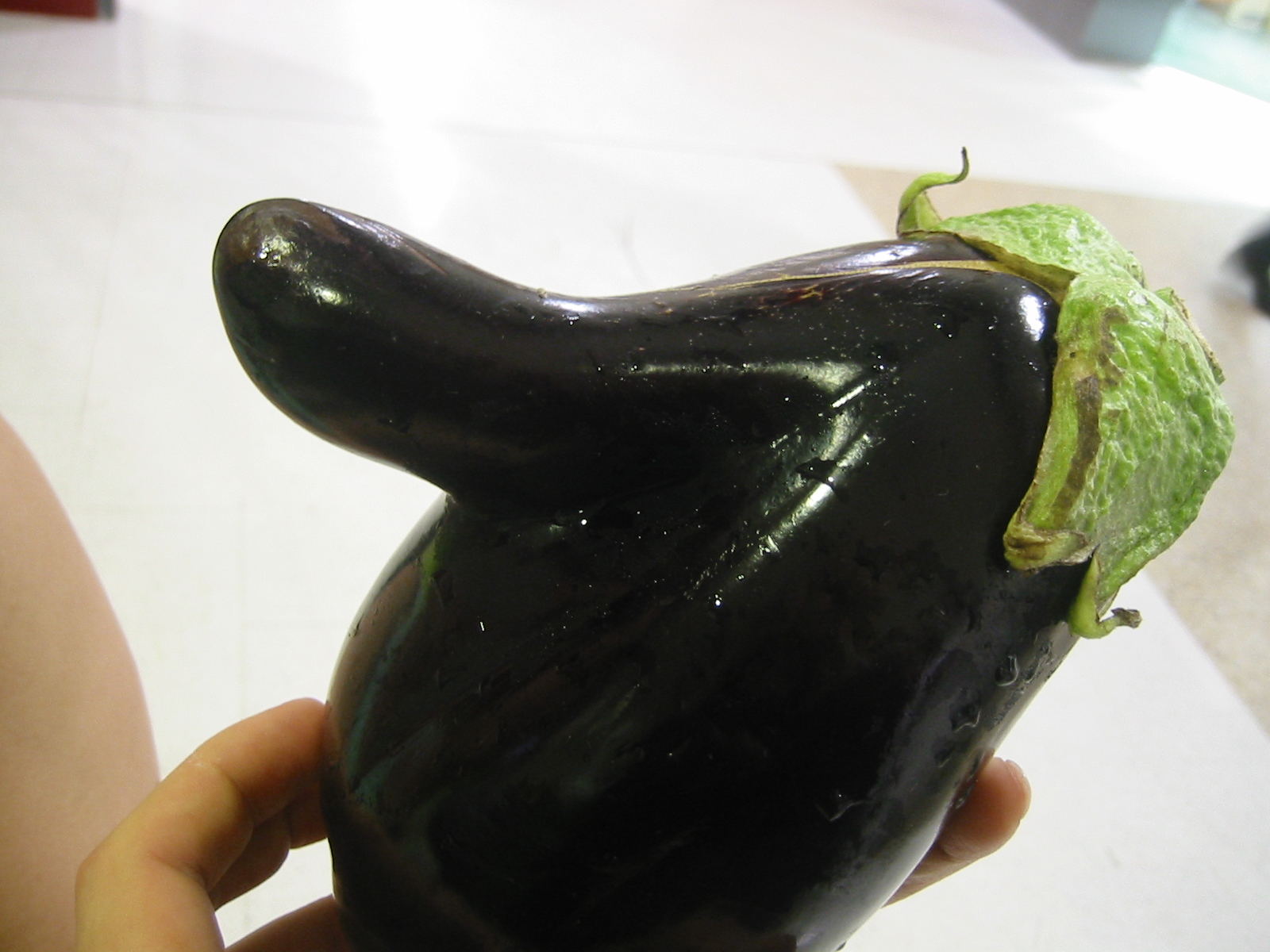
Eggplant fruit, or aubergine.

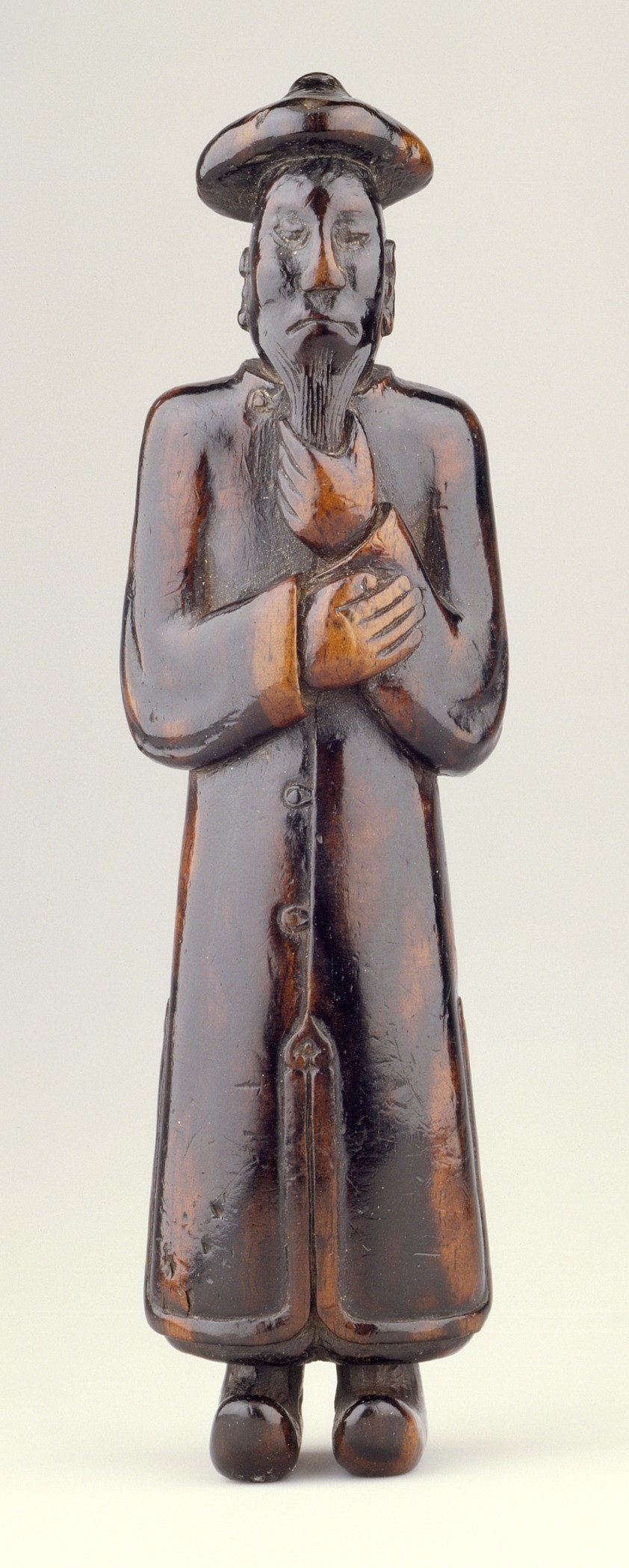
Qing Chinese Mandarin, 18th century wooden image.

The symbology of the imperial examinations and that of imperial appointment to high office are much the same, as would be expected from the close relationship which they share with each other, especially in late imperial times. Wolfram Eberhard (article under title "Official", 214–216) lists a number in his Dictionary of Chinese Symbols, including eggplant (or aubergine) (茄子, qiézi), because the fruit together with its calyx looks like a man wearing a type of cap (冠, guān, which is homonymous with guān, meaning "an official") -- the caps or hats were awarded to promoted officials and so symbolic of official office (Eberhard, under "Aubergine"). Also, beans, or dried bean curd ("bean curd" referring to tofu) also were used in illustrations and other symbology to represent officialdom due to the similarity in sound between dòu gān (豆乾, dried bean curd) and dà guān (大官, high official, as Eberhard discusses under "Bean"). Also, Eberhard defines the combined images of the maple (楓, fēng) and a monkey (猴, hóu), or a monkey and a horse (馬, mǎ) as related to official government service. Also, there is the scholar (士, shì).

== See also ==
- Book of Documents, especially regarding the "Canon of Yao"
- Chinese classic texts
- Civil Service of the People's Republic of China
- Eight-legged essay
- Hanlin Academy
- History of China
- Imperial examination
- Kui Xing
- Nine-rank system
- Scholar-bureaucrats
- Wenchang Wang
