= Miaoli Wenchang Temple =

Temple in Miaoli County, Taiwan

Wenchang Temple
- 文昌祠
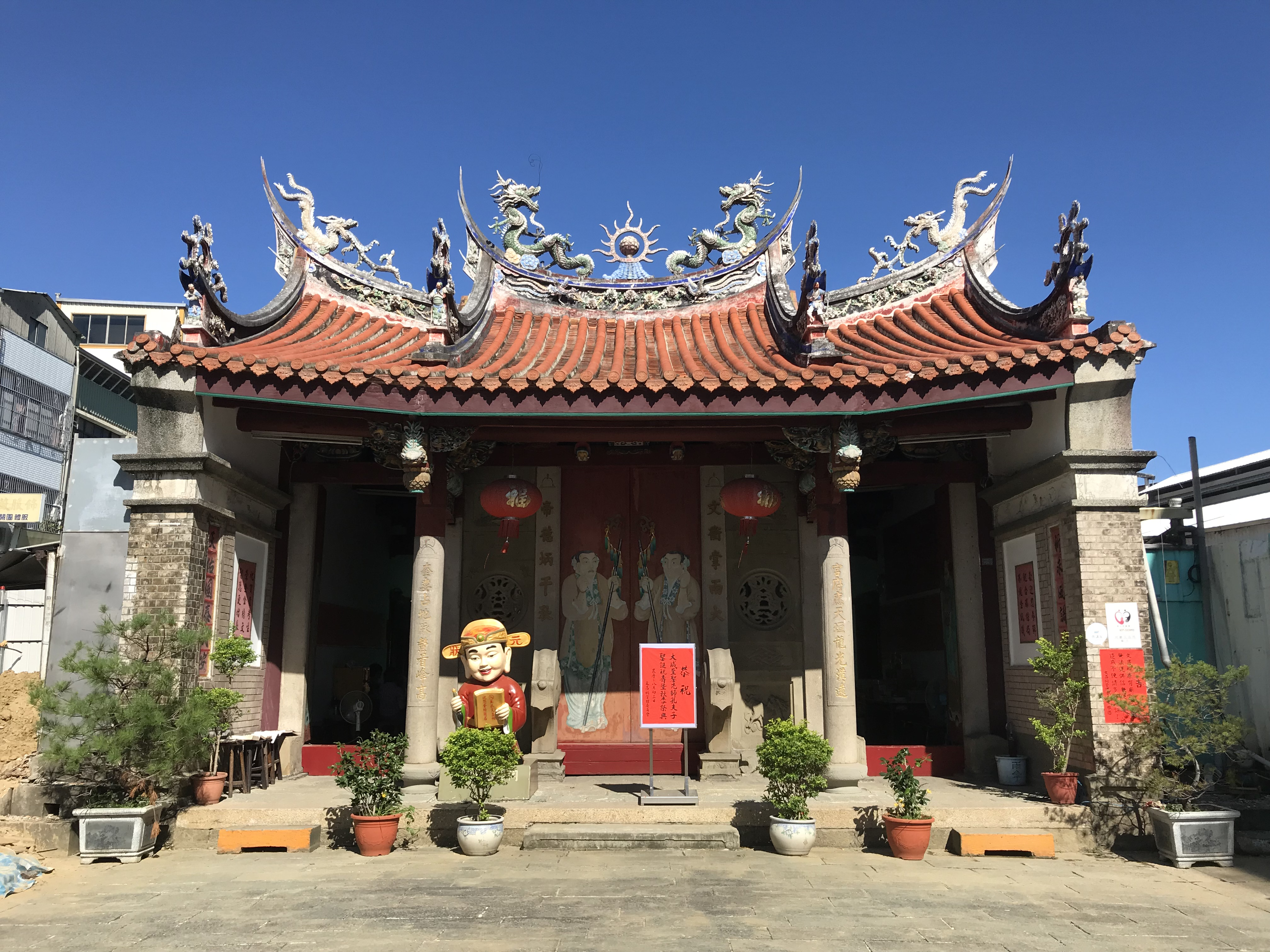
- Exterior of the temple

Religion
- Affiliation: Taoism
- Deity: Wenchang Wang

Location
- Location: Miaoli City, Miaoli County
- Country: Taiwan
- Interactive map of Wenchang Temple
- Coordinates: 24.5539°N 120.8181°E

Architecture
- Completed: 1885
- Direction of façade: Southeast

Miaoli Wenchang Temple (Chinese: 苗栗文昌祠; pinyin: Miáolì Wénchāng Cì), formerly known as Yingcai Academy (Chinese: 英才書院; pinyin: Yīngcái Shūyuàn), is a temple in Miaoli City, Miaoli County, Taiwan. The temple is dedicated to Wenchang Dijun, the deity of culture and literature. Confucius, Cangjie and Kui Xing are also worshipped in the main shrine. During the Qing Dynasty era, the temple also served as the county magistrate's office before a separate county hall was built.

== History ==
Miaoli was originally an agrarian settlement, but in the 19th century, the city's growth saw the rise of an academic society. In 1882, five local scholars proposed that a temple dedicated to Wenchang Wang to be built, and Wenchang Temple was completed in 1885. In 1889, Miaoli County was established but lacked a county hall; therefore, county magistrate Lin Gui-fen set up his office within the temple. The same year, Yingcai Academy was established on temple grounds as a shuyuan, a type of educational institution.

Six years later, Yingcai Academy was shut down by Japanese authorities when Taiwan was ceded to Japan in the 1895 Treaty of Shimonoseki. Nevertheless, the temple was the congregating place for scholars. In 1927, a group of academics banded together to form Lishe (栗社), which regularly held public poetry readings in the temple. Temple itself was heavily damaged by the 1935 Shinchiku-Taichū earthquake and was further damaged when it was used by the Japanese as military barracks and government dormitories.

On 19 August 1985, the Miaoli County Government protected Wenchang Temple as a county-level monument, which allowed for preservation work to be carried out between 1997 and 2002.

== Traditions ==
Usually, the middle door to Wenchang is closed to worshippers and can only be accessed by zhuangyuan, or people that get full marks on the Imperial examination. In 2007, the Miaoli County Government began hosting ceremonies honoring students for their academic achievements by allowing them to step through the middle door. Participants range from those that obtained doctorate degrees to those that acquired good grades on their high school entrance examinations. This is the only government-hosted event of its type in Taiwan.
