= Xiluo Guangfu Temple =

Temple in Xiluo, Yunlin County, Taiwan

- 西螺廣福宮
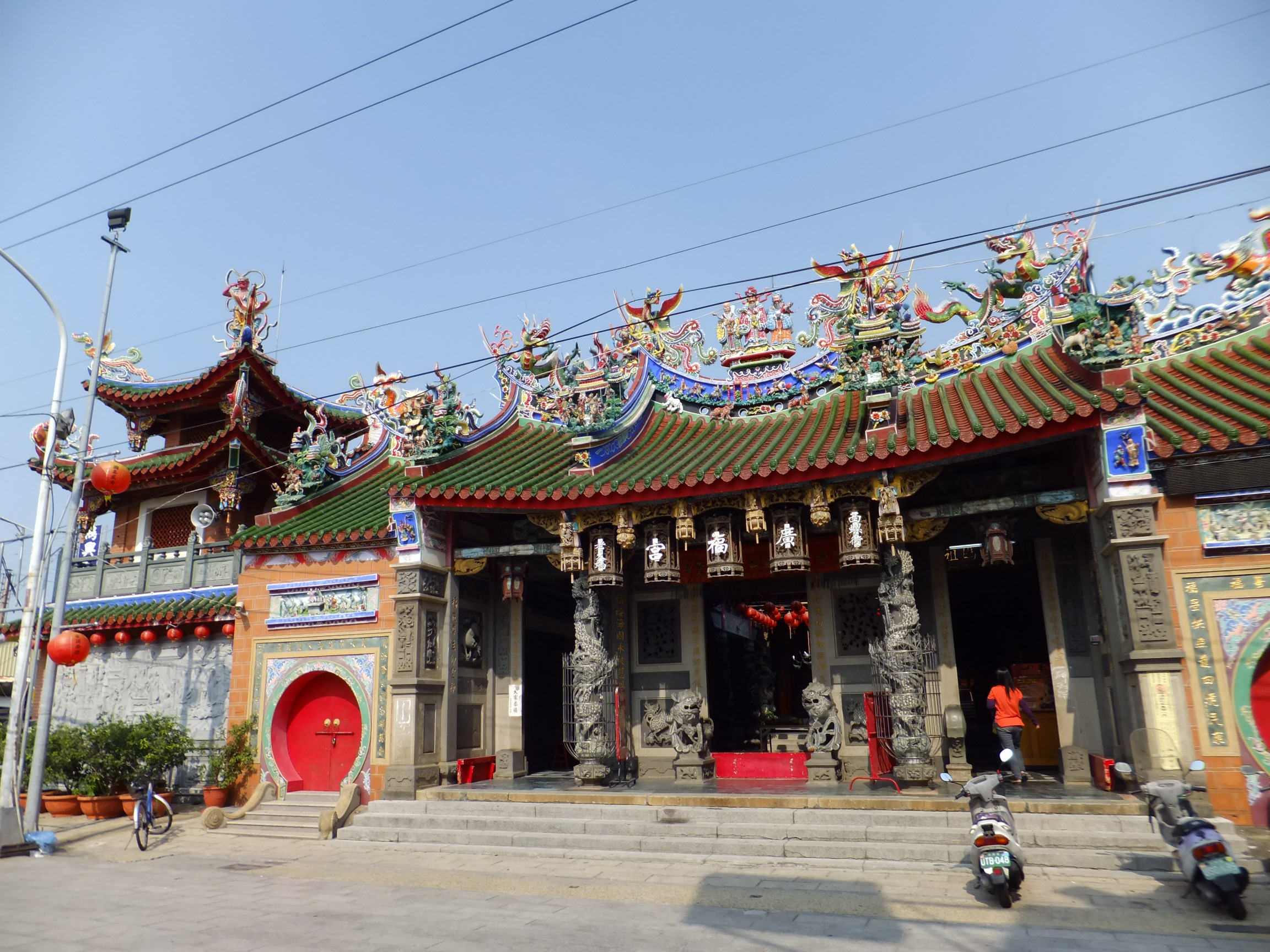

- Location within Yunlin County

Religion
- Deity: Mazu

Location
- Location: Xiluo, Yunlin County, Taiwan
- Interactive map of Xiluo Guangfu Temple
- Coordinates: 23°47′49.9″N 120°27′52.9″E

Architecture
- Type: Mazu temple
- Completed: 1644

The Xiluo Guangfu Temple (traditional Chinese: 西螺廣福宮; simplified Chinese: 西螺广福宫; pinyin: Xīluó Guǎngfú Gōng) is a prominent Mazu temple in Xiluo Township, Yunlin County, Taiwan.

== Name ==
Because of the courtyard house was constructed from the worshiper's donations, the temple was named Guangfu which means wide blessing.

== History ==
The temple was built in 1644.

== See also ==
- Qianliyan & Shunfeng'er
- Chaotian Temple, Beigang
- Gongfan Temple, Mailiao
- List of Mazu temples around the world
- List of temples in Taiwan
- Religion in Taiwan
