= Wenchang, Dongkou =

Subdistrict in Dongkou, Shaoyang, Hunan, China

Coordinates: 27°3′33″N 110°34′15″E

Wenchang Subdistrict (Chinese: 文昌街道; pinyin: Wénchāng Jiēdào) is a subdistrict and the seat of Dongkou County in Hunan, China. It was one of three subdistricts established in July 2015. The subdistrict has an area of 22 km^{2} (8.5 sq mi) with a population of 137,000 (as of 2015). The subdistrict of Wenchang has 9 villages and 5 communities under its jurisdiction.

== History ==
The subdistrict was formed from 12 communities and 6 villages of the former Dongkou Town in July 2015.

== Subdivisions ==
The subdistrict of Wenchang has 5 communities and 9 villages under its jurisdiction.

5 communities

- Bajiaotian Community (Chinese: 八角田社区)
- Huashan Community (Chinese: 花山社区)
- Jucheng Community (Chinese: 桔城社区)
- Longshan Community (Chinese: 龙山社区)
- Wenchang Community (Chinese: 文昌社区)

9 communities

- Daqiao Village (Chinese: 大桥村)
- Gaodu Village (Chinese: 高渡村)
- Jinwu Village (Chinese: 金武村)
- Pingdong Village (Chinese: 平栋村)
- Pingdu Village (Chinese: 平渡村)
- Pingqing Village (Chinese: 平青村)
- Shucai Village (Chinese: 蔬菜村)
- Xinping Village (Chinese: 新平村)
- Zhushan Village (Chinese: 竹山村)
