= Prince of Yi (Ming dynasty) =

Princely peerage created by the Chenghua Emperor

Princedom of Yi
- Creation date: 1487, fief taken in 1495
- Created by: Chenghua Emperor
- Peerage: 1st-rank princely peerage for imperial son of Ming Dynasty
- First holder: Zhu Youbin (Prince Duan)
- Last holder: Zhu Yihao (the 11th prince)
- Status: Extinct
- Extinction date: 1539
- Seats: Jianchangfu (建昌府) (nowadays Nancheng County, Jiangxi province)

Prince of Yi (Chinese: 益王), was a first-rank princely peerage used during Ming dynasty, it was created by the Chenghua Emperor for his sixth son, Zhu Youbin.

== Generation name / poem ==
As members of this peerage were descentants of Yongle Emperor, their generation poem was:-

"Gao Zhan Qi Jian You, Hou Zai Yi Chang You. Ci He Yi Bo Zhong, Jian Jing Di Xian You"
高瞻祁見祐，厚載翊常由。慈和怡伯仲，簡靖迪先猷

The main line of this peerage used the poem until Yi (怡) generation.

== Princedom of Yi ==
Princedom of Yi 益王
- Creation date: 1487
- Creation: first creation
- Created by: Chenghua Emperor
- Peerage: 1st-rank princely peerage for imperial son of Ming Dynasty
- First holder: Zhu Youbin, Prince Duan
- Last holder: Zhu Yihao, 11th Prince of Qin
- Status: Extinct
- Seats: Jianchang (today's part of Nancheng County, Fuzhou, Jiangxi)

- - Prince of Qin
- - Hereditary Prince of Qin

- Zhu Youbin (朱祐檳; 26 Jan 1479 - 5 Oct 1539) (1st), sixth son of Chenghua Emperor. He was made Prince of Yi in 1487, took his princedom which was located at Jianchang in 1495, and died in 1539. His posthumous name was Prince Duan of Yi (益端王)
  - Zhu Houye (朱厚燁; 25 Oct 1498 - 28 Jun 1556) (2nd), first son of Zhu Youbin. He succeeded the principality from 1541 to 1556. His second brother succeeded him as he was sonless. His posthumous name was Prince Zhuang of Yi (益莊王)
  - Zhu Houxuan (朱厚炫; 24 Aug 1500 - 9 Oct 1577) (3rd), second son of Zhu Youbin. He was made a commandery prince, under the title of Prince of Chongren Comm. (崇仁郡王) from 1506 to 1556. He succeeded the principality from 1557 to 1577 from his brother. His posthumous name was Prince Gong of Yi (益恭王)
    - Zhu Zaizeng (朱載增; 1516 - 1546), the first son of Zhu Houxuan. He was initially designated heir apparent for the Princedom of Chongren Comm. in 1529 when his father was made Prince of Chongren. He died before his father and was posthumously bestowed the posthumous name "Prince Zhao of Yi" (益昭王).
      - Zhu Yiyin (朱翊鈏; 28 Aug 1537 - 6 Apr 1603) (4th), first son of Zhu Zaizhen. He was designated the hereditary prince (princely grandson). He succeeded the princedom from 1580 to 1603. His posthumous name was Prince Xuan of Yi (益宣王)
        - Zhu Changqian (朱常; 1559 - 1615) (5th), second son of Zhu Yiyin. He was designated the hereditary prince (princely great-grandson) along with his father who was also designated the hereditary prince. He succeeded the princedom from 1605 - 1615. Full posthumous name: Prince Jing of Yi (益敬王)
          - Zhu Youmu (朱由木; 1588 - 1634) (6th), third son of Prince Jing. He was ordered to change his birth name as he shared the same name with Tianqi Emperor. He was promoted to a commandery prince under the title of Prince of Jiashan Comm. (嘉善郡王) from the title of a defender general in 1588. He succeeded the principality from 1617 to 1634. His posthumous name was Prince Ding of Yi (益定王)
            - Zhu Ciyi (朱慈炲; died 1646) (7th), first son of Zhu Youmu. he succeeded the princedom in 1636. He escaped to Guangdong in 1645 and died after a year in Guangzhou. His posthumous name was Prince Xian of Yi (益先王) or Prince Su of Yi (益素王)
              - Zhu Hexi (朱和壐) (10th), the first son of Zhu Ciyi. he succeeded the principality after 1662.
                - Zhu Yihao (朱怡鎬) (11th), he succeeded the princedom and escaped to Taiwan, but later was located at Qi County, Kaifeng by Qing court.
            - Zhu Cizhu (朱慈燭) (9th), he succeeded the princedom from 1651 to 1662.
        - Zhu Changhu (朱常湖; died 1648), 13th son of Zhu Cizhu. He was made a commandery prince, under the title Comm. Prince of Yunxi (鄖西郡王) from 1595 to 1648. He was posthumously bestowed the title of "Prince of Min" (閩王) by Zhu Yihai.
          - Zhu Youzhen (朱由榛; died 1647) (8th), he was made Prince of Yi and regent by Koxinga at Fuzhou, Jiangxi and was killed by Qing forces.

=== Family tree ===
Family tree of Prince of Yi

Zhu Youbin (朱祐檳; 1479 - 1539); Prince Duan of Yi (益端王) ^{1} 1487 - 1539
1	2
Zhu Houye (朱厚燁; 1498 - 1556); Prince Zhuang of Yi (益莊王) ^{2} 1541 - 1556	Zhu Houxuan (朱厚炫; 1500 - 1577); Prince Gong of Yi (益恭王) ^{3} 1557 - 1577
1
Zhu Zaizhen (朱載增; 1516 - 1546) "Prince Zhao of Yi" (益昭王) (posthumous title)
1
Zhu Yiyin (朱翊鈏; 1537 - 1603); Prince Xuan of Yi (益宣王) ^{4} 1580 - 1603
3	13
Zhu Chang... (朱常; 1559 - 1615); Prince Jing of Yi (益敬王) ^{5} 1605 - 1615	Zhu Changhu (朱常湖; died 1648); Comm. Prince of Yunxi (鄖西郡王); 1595 - 1648 "Prince of Min" (閩王) (posthumous title)
3
Zhu Youmu (朱由木; 1588 - 1634); Prince Ding of Yi (益定王) ^{6} 1617 - 1634	Zhu Youzhen (朱由榛; died 1647); Prince of Yi ^{8} ? - 1647
1
Zhu Ciyi (朱慈炲; died 1646); Prince Xian of Yi (益先王) / Prince Su of Yi (益素王) ^{7} 1636 - 1646	Zhu Cizhu (朱慈燭); Prince of Yi ^{9} 1651 - 1662
1
Zhu Hexi (朱和壐); Prince of Yi ^{10} after 1662
Zhu Yihao (朱怡鎬); Prince of Yi ^{11}

== Non-inherited cadet peerages ==
=== Heirless peerage ===
- Comm. Prince of Yushan (玉山郡王), held by Zhu Houjuan (朱厚㷷), fourth son of Zhu Youbin (1st Prince of Yi), from 1518 to 1552. Full posthumous name: Comm. Prince Gong'an of Yushan (玉山恭安王)
- Comm. Prince of Liqiu (黎丘郡王), held by Zhu Changqin (朱常溱), third son of Zhu Yiyin (4th Prince of Yi) in 1581. Full posthumous name: Comm. Prince Zhuangyi of Liqiu (黎丘莊懿王)
- Comm. Prince of Xunxi (鄖西郡王), held by Zhu Changhu (朱常湖), 13th son of Zhu Yiyin (4th Prince of Yi) and father of Zhu Youzhen (8th Prince of Yi), from 1595 - 1648. He was posthumously bestowed under the posthumous title of "Prince of Min" (閩王)
- Comm. Prince of Fengxin (奉新郡王), held by Zhu Changlian (朱常漣), 19th son of Zhu Yiyin (4th Prince of Yi), from 1606 - 1646.
- Comm. Prince of Xing'an (興安郡王), held by Zhu Youtong (朱由橦), fifth son of 5th Prince of Yi, from 1607 - 1644. He was promoted from a title of defender general.
- Comm. Prince of Yanning (延寧郡王), held by Zhu Youlian (朱由槤), fifth son of 9th Prince of Yi
- Comm. Prince of Yongning (永寧郡王), held by Zhu Youde (朱由𣚅), 10th son of 9th Prince of Yi
- Comm. Prince of Dexing (德興郡王), held by Zhu Youyi (朱由枍), 12th son of 9th Prince of Yi
- Comm. Prince of Zhongxiang (鍾祥郡王), held by Zhu Cilao (朱慈䃕), second son of Zhu Youmu (6th Prince of Yi)
- Comm. Prince of Xinghua (興化郡王), held by Zhu Cichao (朱慈), third son of Zhu Youmu (6th Prince of Yi)
- Comm. Prince of Jinxian (進賢郡王), held by Zhu Citan (朱慈), fourth son of Zhu Youmu (6th Prince of Yi)
- Comm. Prince of Wenchang (文昌郡王; 2nd creation), held by Zhu Cilian (朱慈燫), fifth son of Zhu Youmu (6th Prince of Yi)
- Comm. Prince of Jiancheng (建城郡王), held by Zhu Cican (朱慈燦), sixth son of Zhu Youmu (6th Prince of Yi), from 1645
- Comm. Prince of Zhangde (彰德郡王), held by Zhu Cisui (朱慈煫), sixth son of Zhu Youmu (6th Prince of Yi)

=== Absorbed peerages ===
- Comm. Prince of Chongren (崇仁郡王), initially held by Zhu Houxuan (2nd Prince of Yi)
- Comm. Prince of Jiashan (嘉善郡王), initially held by Zhu Youmu (6th Prince of Yi)

== Inherited cadet peerages ==
=== Comm. Prince of Jinxi ===
The peerage of Comm. Prince of Jinxi (金谿郡王) was created in 1517, continued to 1644. The non-inherited cadet peerage, Comm. Prince of Wenchang (文昌郡王) was a branch of this peerage.

- Zhu Houhuang (朱厚煌) (1st), third son of Zhu Youbin, 1st Prince of Yi. He granted and held the title of Comm. Prince of Jinxi from 1517 to 1550. Full posthumous name: Comm. Prince Zhuanghui of Jinxi (金谿莊惠王)
  - Zhu Zaixi (朱載㙾) (2nd), first son of Zhu Houhuang. He succeeded and held the title of Comm. Prince of Jinxi from 1554 to 1560. Full posthumous name: Comm. Prince Rongjing of Jinxi (金谿榮靖王)
    - Zhu Yishuo (朱翊鑠) (3rd), first son of Zhu Zaixi. He succeeded and held the title of Comm. Prince of Jinxi from 1571 to 1588. Full posthumous name: Comm. Prince Gongxian of Jinxi (金谿恭憲王)
      - 1st son: Zhu Changchi (朱常湁) (4th), first son of Zhu Yishuo. He succeeded and held the title of Comm. Prince of Jinxi from 1591 to before 1621.
        - 1st son: Zhu Youlei (朱由檑) (5th), first son of Zhu Changchi. He was designated as chief son (heir) in 1608. He succeeded and held the title of Comm. Prince of Jinxi from 1621 to 1644.
        - Name unknown, he granted and held the title of Comm. Prince of Wenchang (文昌郡王)
