= Cheng Changwen =

Chinese poet (Tang dynasty)

Cheng Changwen (Chinese: 程長文; pinyin: Chéng zhǎngwén) was a Tang dynasty poet born in Boyang (now part of modern-day Jiangxi). Cheng was both an accomplished poet and calligrapher in the cursive (caoshu) and clerical style (lishu).

Her three surviving compositions include Writing to the Regional Inspector of My Feelings While in Prison, Sorrow of the Bronze Bird Terrace and Sorrow in the Spring Chamber. All three are included in the Complete Collection of Tang Poetry, which is the largest collection of Tang poetry, containing some 49,000 lyric poems by more than twenty-two hundred poets.

Cheng was imprisoned without trial at the age of sixteen for reasons not completely clear. Her long narrative poem, Writing to the Regional Inspector of My Feelings While in Prison alludes to her defending herself against a knife-wielding intruder. The poem was given to the prefect with the hope of clearing her name of false charges, but her fate is unknown.

== Quotations ==
Writing to the Regional Inspector of My Feelings While in Prison

I was raised in a secluded place in Boyang,
With chaste heart, as pure as solitary bamboo.
That year I was sixteen and full of youthful grace.
On ruled paper calligraphy emerged from my flying brush.
All day I would sit at ease, embroidering by the window,
Occasionally by the water I would pluck lotus and return.
Who was this person living humbly in her hometown,
Alone in her hidden chamber, unknown to others?
Sea swallows returned each morning, chilling coverlet and pillow;
Mountain blossoms fell at night, dampening the outside stairs.
That evil man, what were his intentions?
Knife shining in hand, he moved towards the curtain.
This single life would yield to the steel blade,
But could the value of my honor be darkly compromised?
My resolve was rock-firm, my feelings unwavering,
My will like autumn frost, my mind unshakable.
Blood splattered my silk garment, but to the end no regrets,
Stained my embroidered sleeves, but how could I turn back?
The district official had not learned of the details of what passed When he ordered me locked in the prison.
My red lips now taste falling tears, alone I bear this wrong,
My jade tears flowing criss-cross, I sigh over this injustice.
The cold watches of the tenth month make one long for a friend;
Each beat of the night watchman's clapper renews my grief.
My hair, uncombed, now falls like scattering clouds,
Moth-eyebrows, unswept, are still like the new moon.
The severe sentence I have been dealt is hard to escape,
This eternal matter of my heart, to whom can I express it?
I only hope to be cleared and released from this jail,
So others will trust this white jade is without flaw.
