= Xiluo =

Urban township in Yunlin, Taiwan

Coordinates: 23.782674°N 120.455105°E

Xiluo Township 西螺鎮 Seira
- Urban township
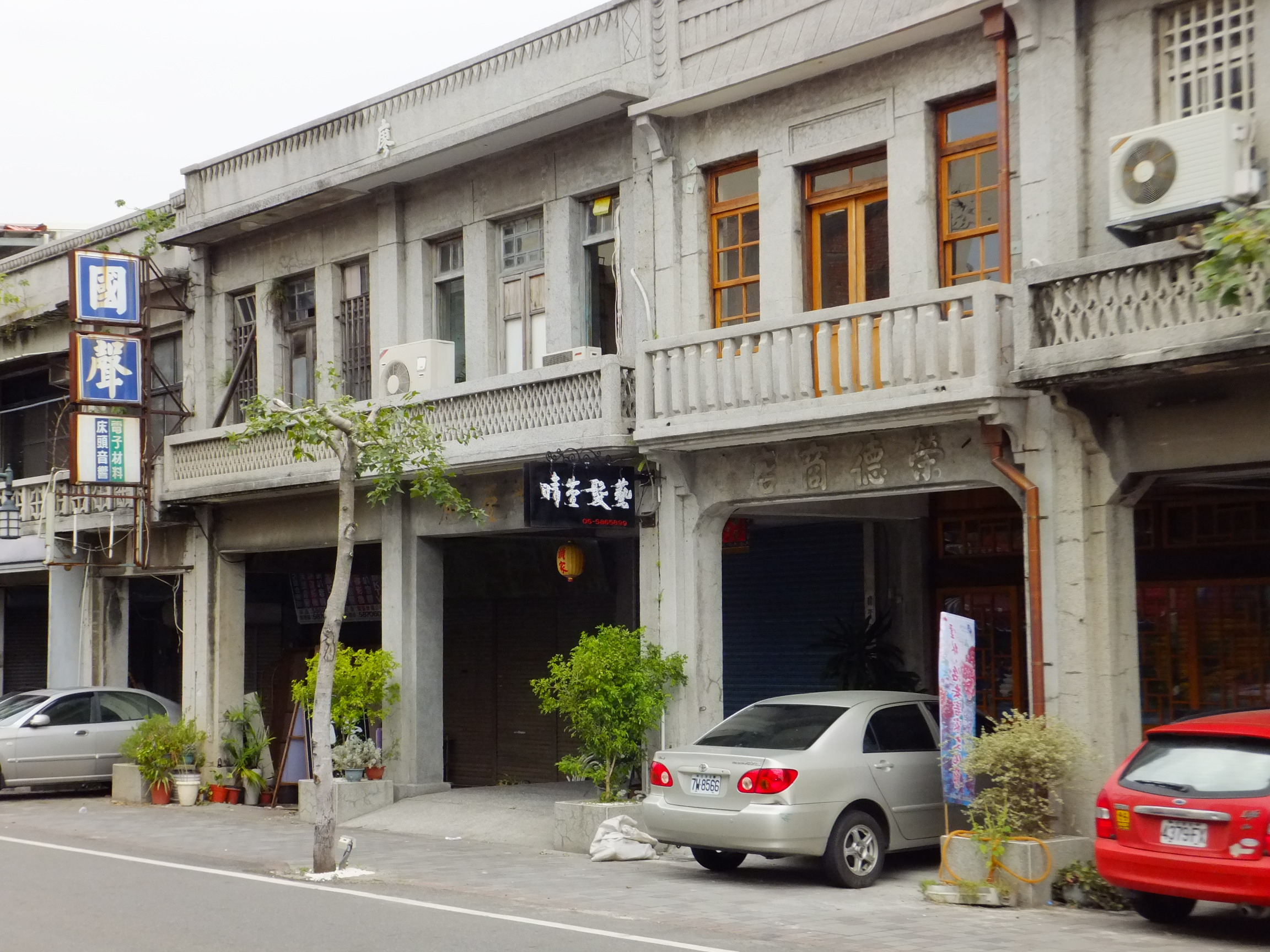
- Yenping Street

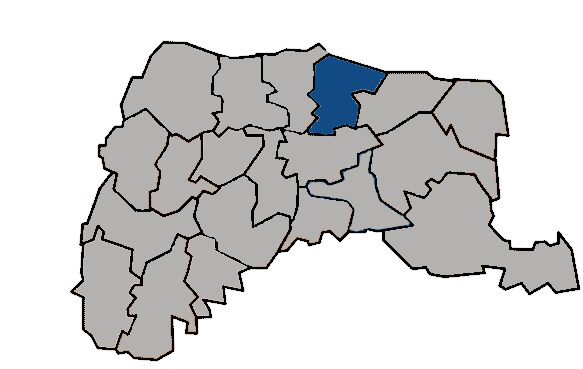
- Xiluo Township in Yunlin County
- Location: Yunlin County, Taiwan

Area
  - Total: 50 km^{2} (19 sq mi)

Population (February 2023)
  - Total: 44,610
  - Density: 890/km^{2} (2,300/sq mi)

Xiluo Township or Siluo Township (Chinese: 西螺鎮; Hanyu Pinyin: Xīluó Zhèn; Tongyong Pinyin: Siluó Jhèn; Wade–Giles: Hsi^{1}-lo^{2} Chen^{4}) is an urban township in Yunlin County, Taiwan.

== History ==
The place was originally called Sailei by the native Babuza people, which later become Xiluo by translating from Hokkien to Mandarin. It is also formerly called Le-iâng (Chinese: 螺陽; Pe̍h-ōe-jī: Lê-iâng) after the Chinese colonizers hometown.

== Geography ==
It has a population total of 44,610 and an area of 49.7985 square kilometres.

== Administrative divisions ==
The township comprises 27 villages: Anding, Beitou, Daxin, Dayuan, Dingnan, Futian, Fuxing, Gongguan, Guangfu, Guanghua, Guangxing, Hanguang, Henan, Jiulong, Luchang, Qizuo, Tungxing, Wucuo, Xianan, Xinan, Xinfeng, Yongan, Zhaoan, Zhengxing, Zhenxing, Zhonghe and Zhongxing.

== Economy ==
Xiluo Township is one of the most important vegetable growing areas in Taiwan.

== Tourist attractions ==
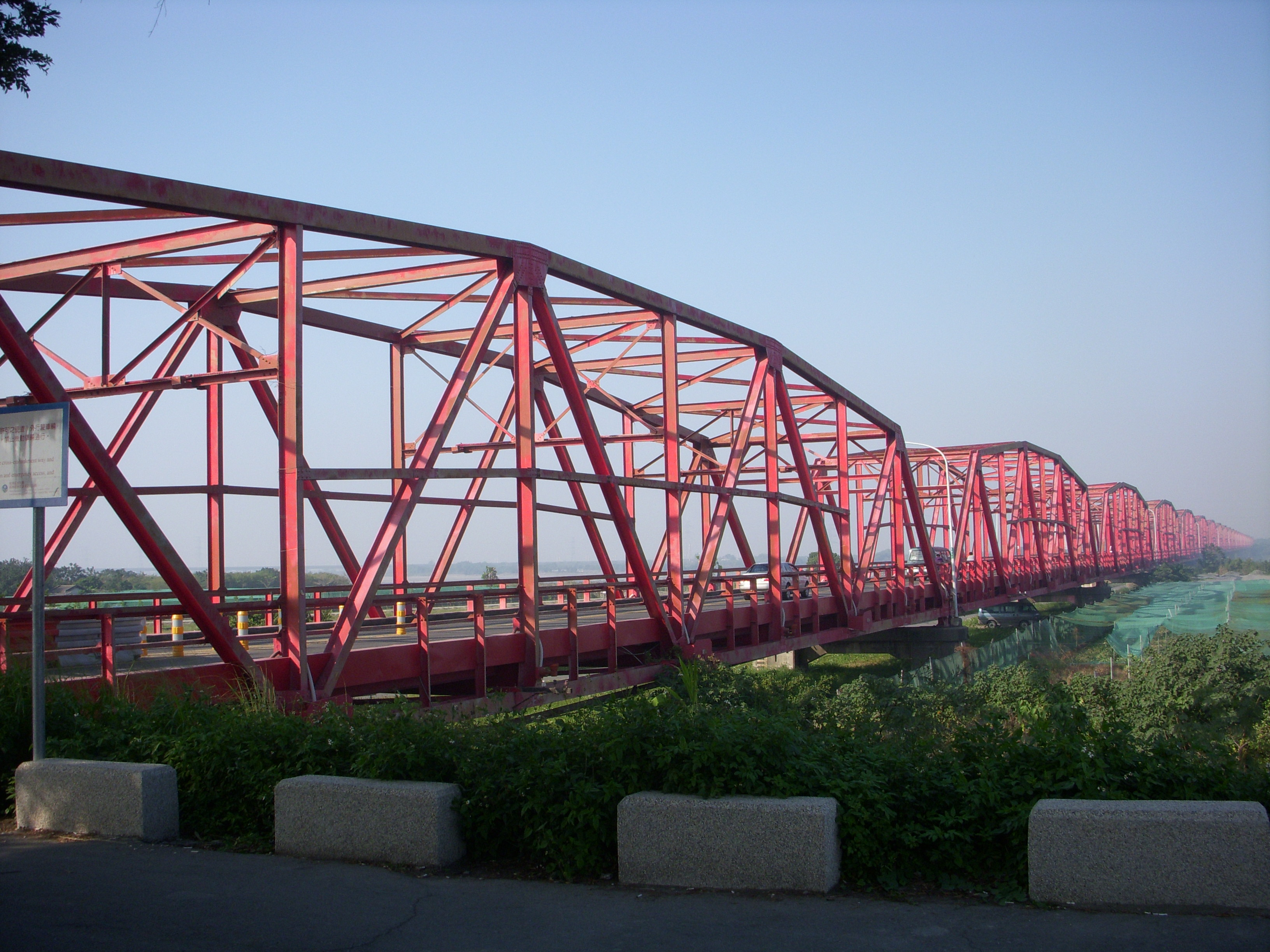
The Xiluo Bridge over Zhuoshui River

- Archway of Ci Kan Martial Art
- Ci Kan of Siluo
- Jhen Wen Academy
- Master A-Shan's Cemetery
- Xiluo Bridge
- Xiluo Fuxing Temple
- Xiluo Guangfu Temple
- Xiluo Theater
- Yanping Street

== Notable natives ==
- Jeff Chang, singer
- Lee Chia-fen, educator and politician
- Liao Hsiao-chun, television presenter
- Chung Jen-pi, potehi puppeteer
- Thomas Liao, former activist
