= Wen County =

Wen County may refer to two counties of the People's Republic of China:

- Wen County, Gansu (文县), county of Longnan City
- Wen County, Henan (温县), county in Jiaozuo City
