= Jhen Wen Academy =

Former tutorial academy in Xiluo, Yunlin County, Taiwan

Jhen Wen Academy 振文書院
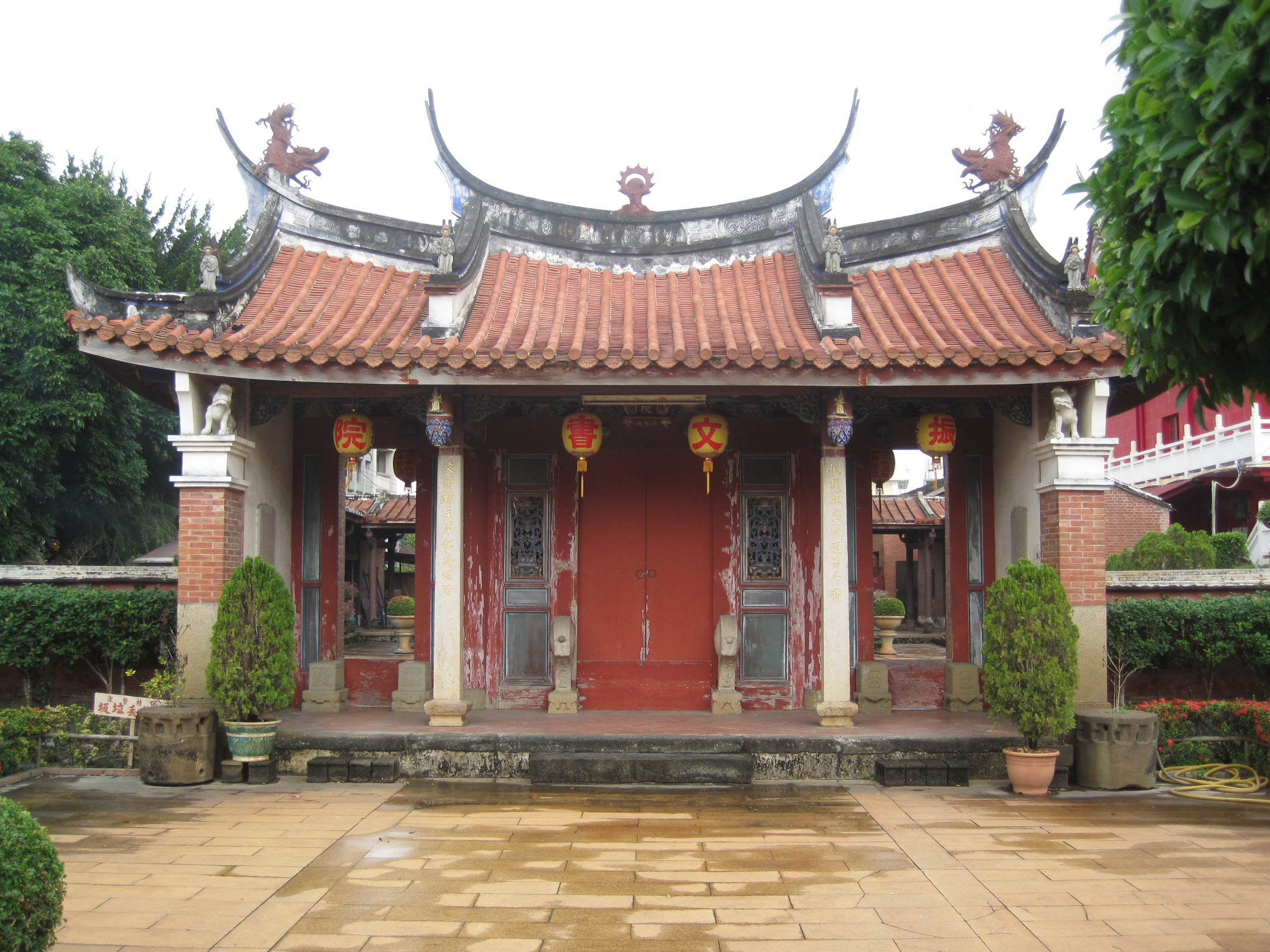

Location
- Xiluo, Yunlin County, Taiwan
- 23°47′39.9″N 120°27′51.9″E

Information
- Type: former academy
- Established: 1797

The Jhen Wen Academy (traditional Chinese: 振文書院; simplified Chinese: 振文书院; pinyin: Zhènwén Shūyuàn) is a former tutorial academy in Xiluo Township, Yunlin County, Taiwan.

== History ==
The academies was originally built in 1797 as Wen Chang Temple to worship five major heavenly emperors of learning during the Qing Dynasty rule of Taiwan. It was the place where Jhen Wen Club was established for scholars to study poetry. In 1812, an academy for classical learning was proposed. It was completed one year later and renamed Jhen Wen Academy. On 8 October 1979, the site was tentatively listed as a class 3 national monument by the Ministry of the Interior and officially became a historic monument in 1985. Renovation was made for the great gate which was finished in 1989.

== Architecture ==
The academy has two floors. The main hall and the wing room are constructed of bricks. The roof is adorned with various sculptures in the shapes of flowers and birds. Stone drums are placed in front of the middle door and act as part of foundation of pillars. Sculptures can be divided into stone carving and wood carving.

== See also ==
- Academies (Shuyuan)
- List of tourist attractions in Taiwan
