= Xuefeng =

Subdistrict of Dongkou County, Hunan, China

Coordinates: 27°4′9.1″N 110°35′58.6″E

Xuefeng Subdistrict (Chinese: 雪峰街道; pinyin: Xuěfēng Jiēdào) is a subdistrict of Dongkou County in Hunan, China. It was one of three subdistricts established in July 2015. The subdistrict has an area of 78.4 km^{2} (30.3 sq mi) with a population of 73,800 (as of 2015). The subdistrict of Xuefeng has 16 villages and a community under its jurisdiction.

== History ==
The subdistrict was formed from 23 villages of the former Dongkou Town in July 2015.

== Subdivisions ==
The subdistrict of Xuefeng has a community and 16 villages under its jurisdiction.

Communities

- Hezitang Community (Chinese: 荷子塘社区)

Villages

- Baitian Village (Chinese: 白田村)
- Baomu Village (Chinese: 报木村)
- Dasheng Village (Chinese: 大胜村)
- Datian Village (Chinese: 大田村)
- Dexiang Village (Chinese: 德巷村)
- Hetang Village (Chinese: 合塘村)
- Hongwei Village (Chinese: 红卫村)
- Huanan Village (Chinese: 华南村)
- Madu Village (Chinese: 马渡村)
- Minfeng Village (Chinese: 民丰村)
- Mugua Village (Chinese: 木瓜村)
- Pingmei Village (Chinese: 平梅村)
- Shuanglian Village (Chinese: 双联村)
- Tianjing Village (Chinese: 天井村)
- Yuanfeng Village (Chinese: 袁丰村)
- Zhaling Village (Chinese: 楂林村)
