= 文 (disambiguation) =

文 (pinyin wén) is Kangxi radical 67, which means "literature" or "culture".

文 may also refer to:

- the Chinese for "literature", see Chinese literature
- the Chinese for "culture", see Chinese culture
- the Chinese for "writing", see Chinese writing
- the Chinese for "civil", see Wen and wu

As a proper name, it may also refer to:

In currencies:

- Chinese cash (currency unit), "wén", the currency of China prior to the yuan
- Japanese mon (currency), a currency used in Japan until 1870
- Korean mun, the main currency of Korea from 1633 until 1892
- Ryukyuan mon, the currency of the Ryukyu islands from 1454 until 1879
- Vietnamese cash or văn, the currency of Vietnam from 968 until 1945

In people:

- King Mun of Balhae (文王) (r. 737–793), ruler of an ancient Korean kingdom
- Emperor Wen of Han China (漢文帝) (202 BC–157 BC), Han dynasty Chinese ruler
- Emperor Wen of Liu Song (宋文帝) (407–453), Liu Song dynasty Chinese ruler
- Fumi Hirano (平野文) (b. 1955), Japanese voice actress and essayist
- King Wen of Zhou (周文王) (1099–1050 BC), Zhou dynasty Chinese ruler
- Wen Tianxiang (文天祥) (1236–1283 AD), Song dynasty prime minister, scholar-general
- Wen Zhengming (文徵明) (1470–1559), Ming dynasty painter, calligrapher, and scholar
- Wen Zhenheng (文震亨) (1585–1645 AD), Ming dynasty painter, scholar

== See also ==
- Wen County (disambiguation)
- Wen Jiabao, Premier of the People's Republic of China, with the similar-sounding surname 温 (wēn)
