= Dongkou County =

Dongkou 洞口县
- County
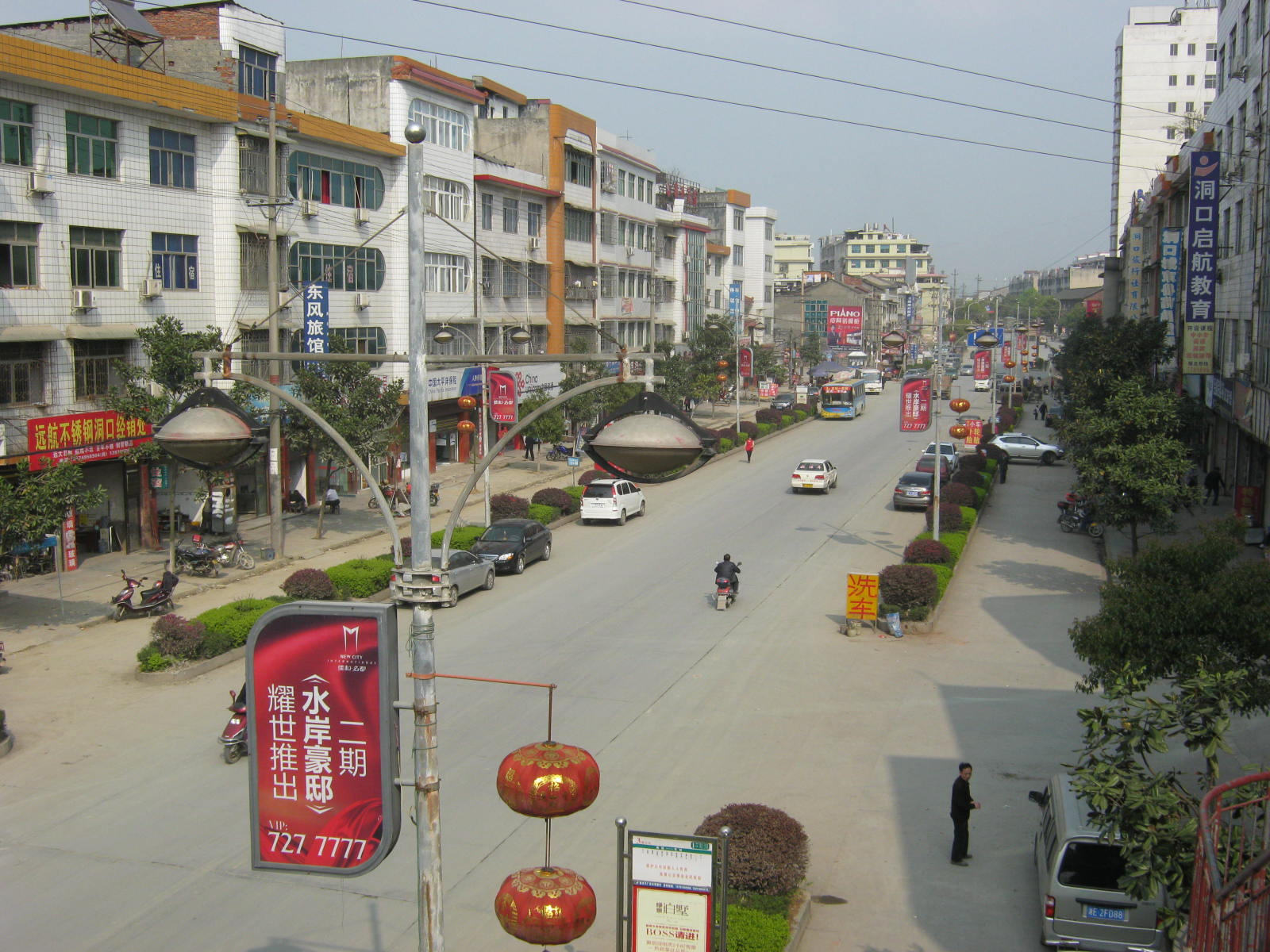
- East Xuefeng Road (雪峰东路)

- Location in Hunan
- Coordinates: 27°03′37″N 110°34′33″E
- Country: People's Republic of China
- Province: Hunan
- Prefecture-level city: Shaoyang
- Time zone: UTC+8 (China Standard)

Dongkou County (simplified Chinese: 洞口县; traditional Chinese: 洞口縣; pinyin: Dòngkǒu Xiàn) is a county in the Province of Hunan, China. It is under the administration of Shaoyang City. Located in west-central Hunan, the county is bordered to the northeast by Longhui County, to the northwest by Xupu County and Hongjiang City, to the southwest by Suining County, and to the southeast by Xinning County. Dongkou County covers an area of 2,200 km^{2} (850 sq mi), as of 2015, it had a registered population of 870,900 and a permanent resident population of 784,500. The county has 11 towns, nine townships and three subdistricts under its jurisdiction, and the county seat is Wenchang Subdistrict (文昌街道).

== Administrative divisions ==
3 subdistricts

- Huagu (花古街道)
- Wenchang (文昌街道)
- Xuefeng (雪峰街道)

11 towns

- Gaosha (高沙镇)
- Huayuan (花园镇)
- Huangqiao (黄桥镇)
- Jiangkou (江口镇)
- Liaotian (醪田镇)
- Shanmen (山门镇)
- Shijiang (石江镇)
- Shuidong (水东镇)
- Yanqian (岩山镇)
- Yulan (毓兰镇)
- Zhushi (竹市镇)

6 townships

- Gulou (古楼乡)
- Shizhu (石柱乡)
- Tongshan (桐山乡)
- Yanglin (杨林乡)
- Yuexi (月溪乡)
- Zhaping (渣坪乡)

3 Yao ethnic townships

- Changtang (长塘瑶族乡)
- Dawu (大屋瑶族乡)
- Luoxi (罗溪瑶族乡)

== Climate ==
Climate data for Dongkou, elevation 340 m (1,120 ft), (1991–2020 normals, extremes 1991–present)
Month	Jan	Feb	Mar	Apr	May	Jun	Jul	Aug	Sep	Oct	Nov	Dec	Year
Record high °C (°F)	25.4 (77.7)	29.8 (85.6)	32.4 (90.3)	34.6 (94.3)	36.3 (97.3)	36.4 (97.5)	38.5 (101.3)	39.1 (102.4)	36.7 (98.1)	35.2 (95.4)	30.5 (86.9)	23.4 (74.1)	39.1 (102.4)
Mean daily maximum °C (°F)	8.7 (47.7)	11.4 (52.5)	15.6 (60.1)	22.2 (72.0)	26.4 (79.5)	29.1 (84.4)	32.2 (90.0)	31.9 (89.4)	28.2 (82.8)	22.8 (73.0)	17.5 (63.5)	11.5 (52.7)	21.5 (70.6)
Daily mean °C (°F)	5.5 (41.9)	7.7 (45.9)	11.6 (52.9)	17.6 (63.7)	21.8 (71.2)	25.0 (77.0)	27.5 (81.5)	26.9 (80.4)	23.5 (74.3)	18.2 (64.8)	12.9 (55.2)	7.6 (45.7)	17.2 (62.9)
Mean daily minimum °C (°F)	3.1 (37.6)	5.1 (41.2)	8.7 (47.7)	14.1 (57.4)	18.3 (64.9)	21.9 (71.4)	23.7 (74.7)	23.3 (73.9)	20.0 (68.0)	14.9 (58.8)	9.7 (49.5)	4.7 (40.5)	14.0 (57.1)
Record low °C (°F)	−7.0 (19.4)	−5.0 (23.0)	−1.1 (30.0)	2.0 (35.6)	9.6 (49.3)	15.8 (60.4)	17.3 (63.1)	15.8 (60.4)	11.6 (52.9)	4.0 (39.2)	0.2 (32.4)	−7.3 (18.9)	−7.3 (18.9)
Average precipitation mm (inches)	74.3 (2.93)	77.1 (3.04)	127.2 (5.01)	162.7 (6.41)	204.5 (8.05)	259.0 (10.20)	180.9 (7.12)	132.0 (5.20)	82.4 (3.24)	87.6 (3.45)	79.4 (3.13)	55.6 (2.19)	1,522.7 (59.97)
Average precipitation days (≥ 0.1 mm)	15.5	15.8	19.1	17.3	17.0	17.1	12.6	12.5	9.9	11.7	12.1	12.4	173
Average snowy days	4.0	2.4	0.4	0	0	0	0	0	0	0	0.1	1.2	8.1
Average relative humidity (%)	82	82	83	81	80	84	79	79	79	79	79	78	80
Mean monthly sunshine hours	57.0	52.3	67.3	102.4	124.4	122.4	207.5	197.0	144.3	119.6	111.1	89.1	1,394.4
Percentage possible sunshine	17	16	18	27	30	30	49	49	39	34	35	28	31
Source: China Meteorological Administration all-time May record high

== Transportation ==
Dongkou railway station on the Huaihua–Shaoyang–Hengyang railway is located here.
