= Wen =

Wen, wen, or WEN may refer to:

- One of several Chinese surnames:
  - Wen (surname 文)
  - Wen (surname 溫)
  - Wen (surname 闻)
- Wen, alternate spelling for Wynn (Ƿ ƿ), a letter of the Old English alphabet
- Wen, common name for trichilemmal cyst or pilar cyst
  - Wen, sebaceous cyst, a form of trichilemmal cyst
- Wen, alternate name for lipoma, a benign tumor composed of adipose tissue
- wen, the ISO 639-2 code for the Sorbian languages, also known as Wendish languages
- WEN, New York Stock Exchange symbol for Wendy's/Arby's Group
- WEN, Amtrak station code for Columbia Station in Wenatchee, Washington, United States
- WEN, ICAO airline designator for WestJet Encore
- Chinese wen or wén, a coin or currency-unit in the monetary system of Imperial China

== See also ==
- The Great Wen, a derogatory nickname for London
- 文 (disambiguation) (Wén)
- Wen County (disambiguation)
