= Wenchang Wang =

Taoist deity in Chinese mythology

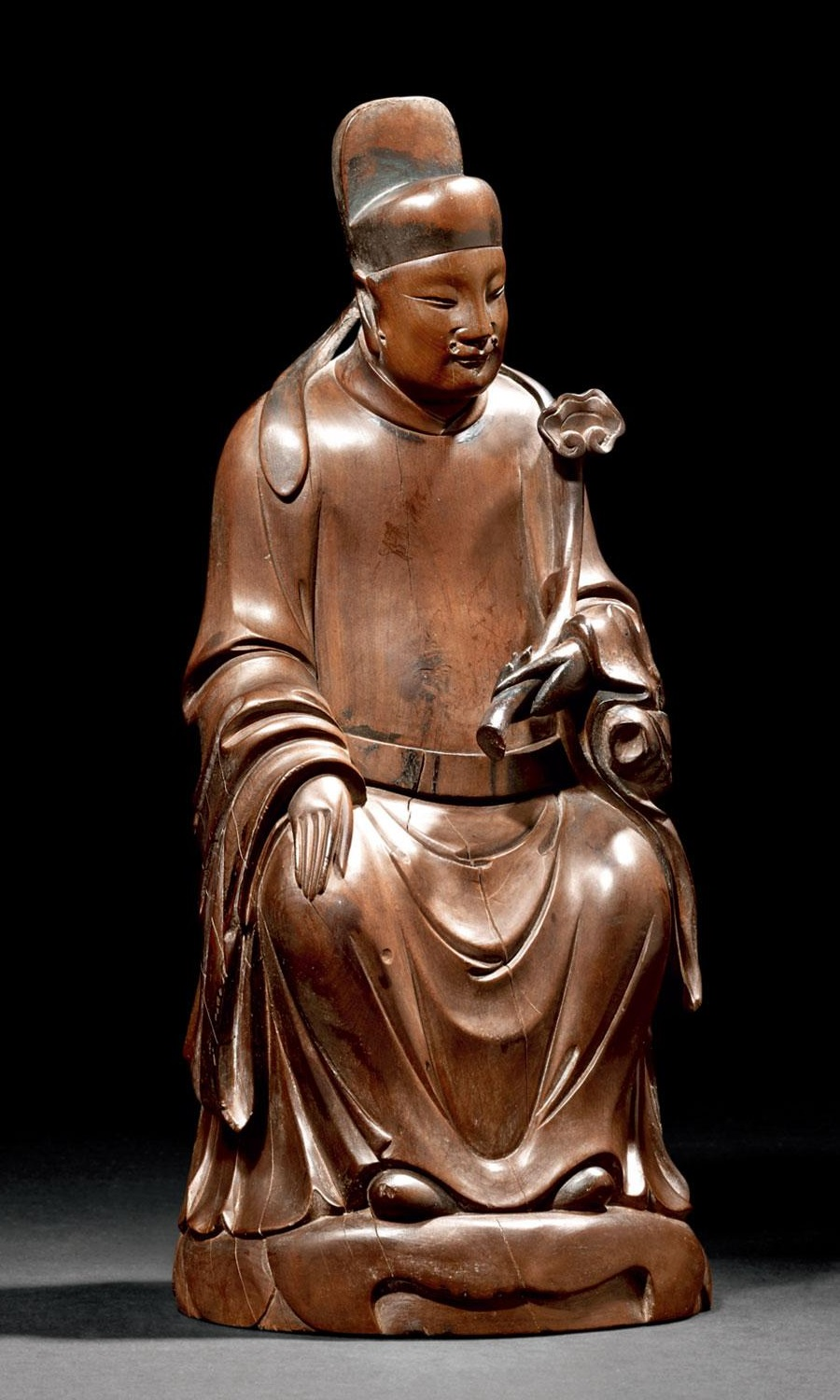
A Ming dynasty wooden statue of Wenchang Wang

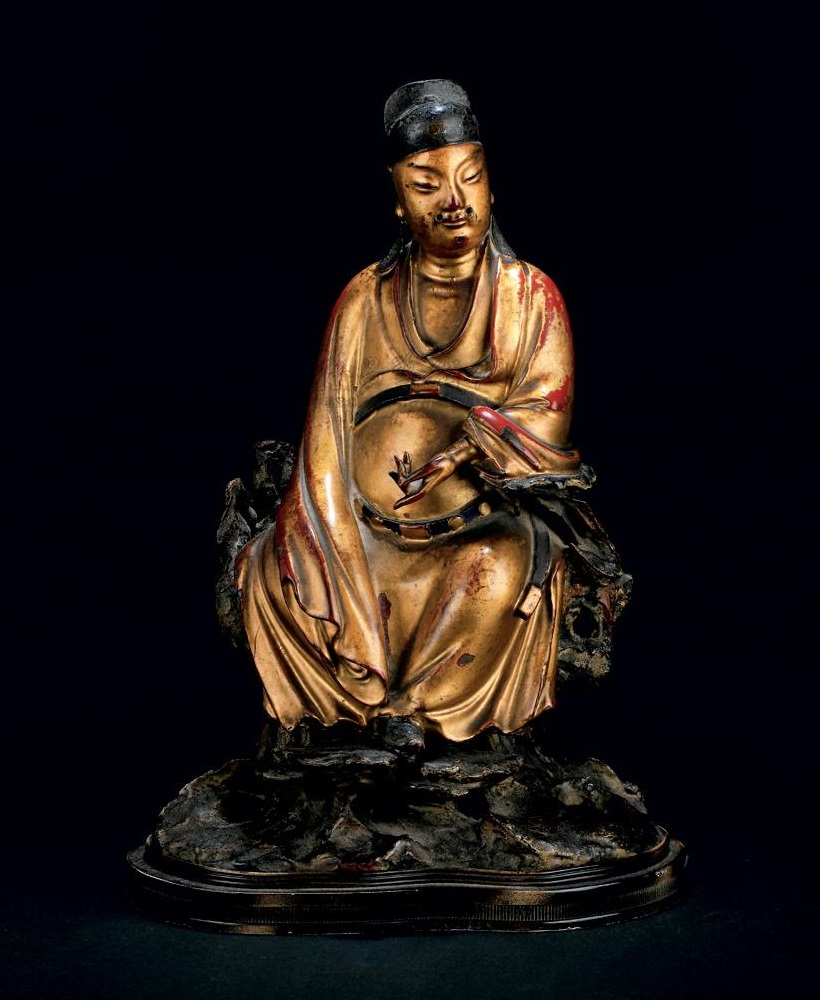
A Qing dynasty bronze statue of Wenchang Wang

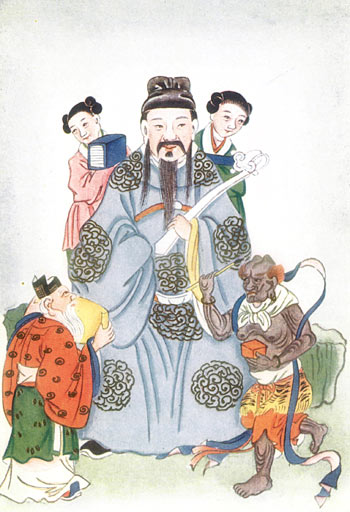
Wenchang Wang as depicted in a painting

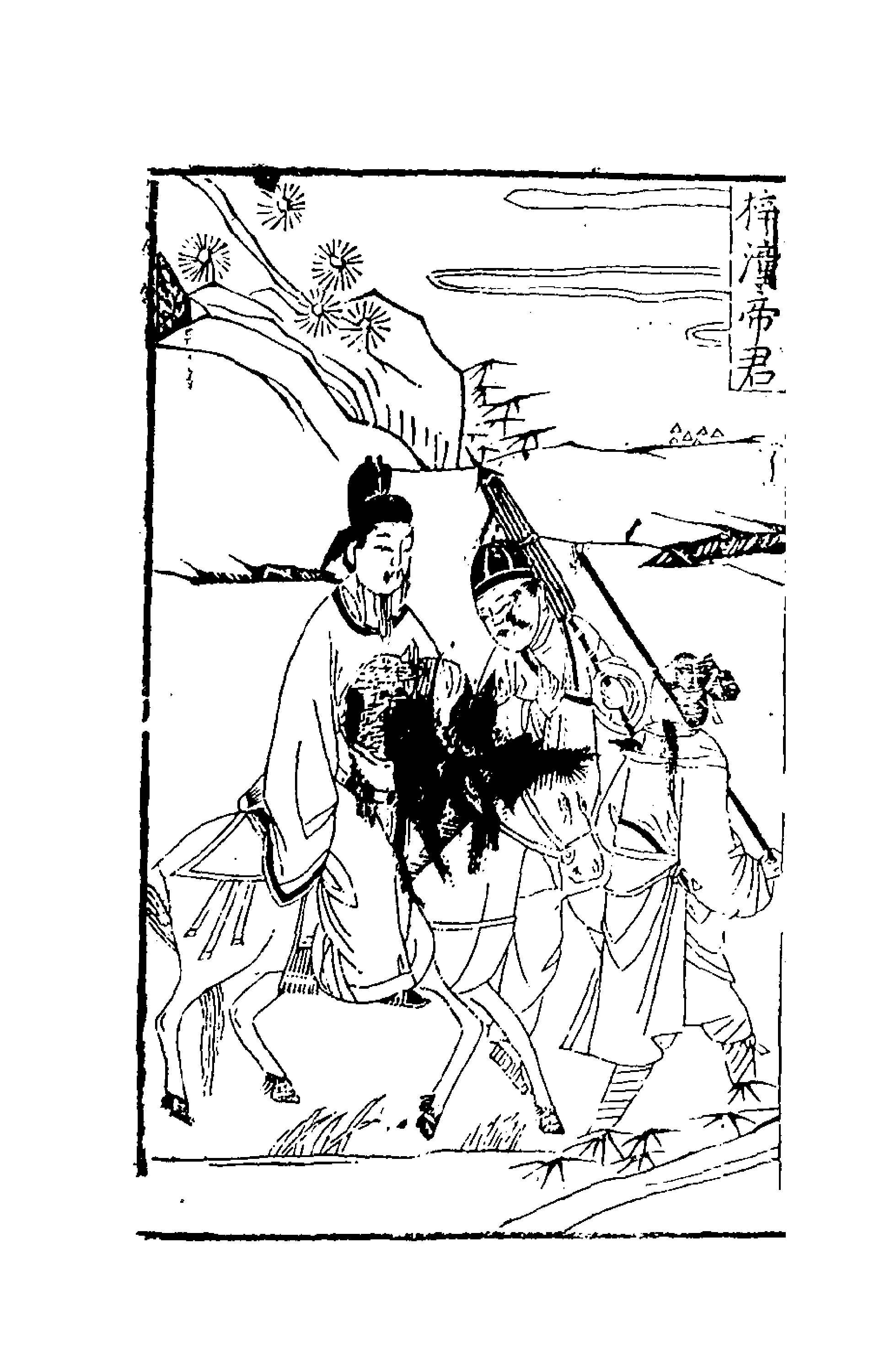
Wenchang Wang as depicted in a 1600 print

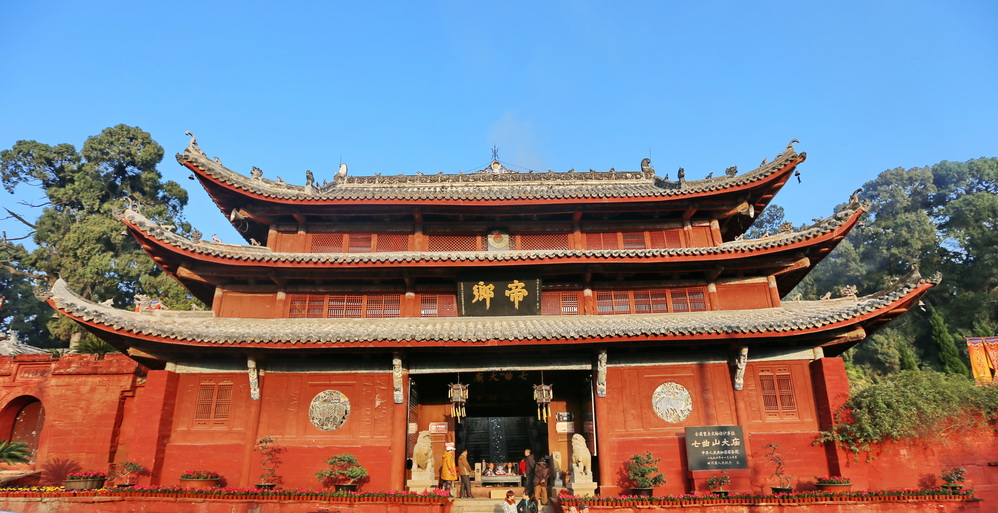
Wenchang Temple of Zitong in Sichuan province

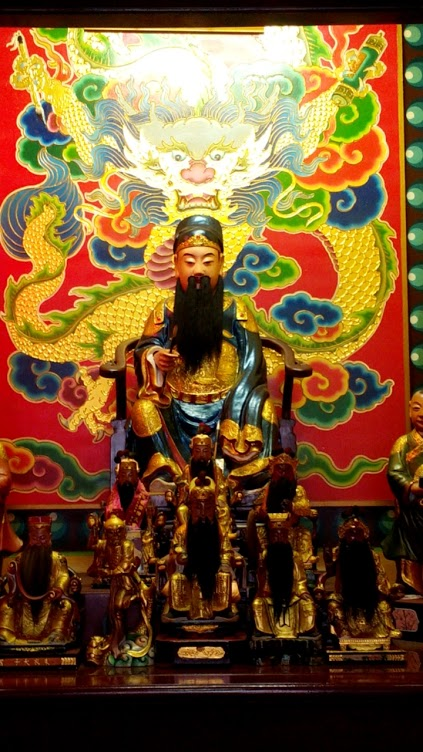
Wenchang statue in Taoyuan City, Taiwan

Wenchang Wang (Chinese: 文昌王; pinyin: Wénchāng Wáng; Pe̍h-ōe-jī: Bûn-chhiong Ông), also known as Wenchang Dijun (Chinese: 文昌帝君; pinyin: Wénchāng Dìjūn; Pe̍h-ōe-jī: Bûn-chhiong Tè-kun), is a Taoist deity in Chinese mythology, known as the God of Culture and Literature. He is also at times referred to simply as Wen Qu, or Wen. The literal translation of his name would be King (王) of Flourishing (昌) Culture/Language (文). Wenchang Wang is physically represented by a constellation of six stars near the Big Dipper. The stars all had names of their own: Shangjiang (上將), Cijiang (次將), Guixiang (貴相o), Siming (司命), Sizhong (司中), and Silu (司祿). Wenchang Wang is often depicted as an elderly scholar accompanied by two attendants, Tianlong (天聾 or Heaven-Deaf) and Diya (地啞 or Earth-Mute). At tibetan call as ཨ་མྱེས་ཡུལ་ལྷ He sometimes holds a pen and a book that says "Heaven determines literary achievement". He has historically been called upon by scholars and writers who need inspiration or help right before an exam.

== Story ==
There are quite a few accounts of Wenchang Wang; most depict him as a man by the name Zhang Yazi (張亞子), of a county in Sichuan Province called Zitong. A particular account cites him as a war hero, having died an honorable death in a rebellion against Emperor Fú Jiān in 374. Other accounts of Wenchang Wang appear rather sporadically at different time periods; he has been given seventeen reincarnations over a period of 3,000 years. A notable account of an appearance of Wenchang Wang was as the Spirit of Zitong, during the suppression of a rebellion in Chengdu, Sichuan, in 1000 A.D. A man allegedly climbed a ladder in midst of battle and declared that the Spirit of Zitong told him the "town [of rebels] would fall on the twentieth day of the ninth moon." The town fell on the day indicated, and the general in charge of repressing the rebellion had the temple repaired.

In addition to being a respected warrior, Wenchang Wang was well respected as a model for filiality. The Book of Emperor Zi Tong records: "Wenchang had a mature mind at birth. His mother breastfed him even though she was perilously ill and malnourished. In the middle of the night, Wenchang cut flesh from his own thighs and fed it to his mother. She was then cured of her illness."

Wenchang Wang also appears in other texts, where he is praised for other noble virtues. The book Wenchang Emperor and the States He Stabilized states: "He descended into the mortal world seventy-three times as a shidafu" (a scholar-bureaucrat position in the emperor's government of feudal China). Wenchang was uncorrupted, upright and just, and never dealt out harsh punishments to the people. He allegedly helps people when they have hardships, saves those who are in trouble, has compassion for the lonely, forgives people's mistakes, and leaves peace and stability everywhere he goes. Because of this, the Jade Emperor put him in charge of the elections of village leaders.

Besides that, structures dedicated to the high god Wenchang and his subordinate Kuixing were a pervasive feature of cityscapes in late imperial China, as represented in local gazetteers.

== Controversy ==
There is controversy over the actual position of Wenchang, despite common practice of attributing him to Zhang Yazi. Many point out that the stories on Zhang Yazi are attributed mainly to honor and heroism, having nothing to do with actual literature. In his Myths and Legends of China, E.T.C. Werner points out that "Wherever Wenchang is worshiped there will also be found a separate representation of Kui Xing, showing that while the official deity has been allowed to 'borrow glory' from the popular god, and even to assume his personality, the independent existence of the stellar spirit is nevertheless sedulously maintained." The story being that Zhang Kui (Kui Xing) was a brilliant scholar who was, because of his unsightly face, not recognized by the Emperor when he passed the top examinations. Feeling dejected, he threw himself into the ocean, and ascended into the heavens as a star. Initially, scholars worshiped this star, Kui Xing, as the God of Literature, but with time, he was eventually linked to the Dipper (constellation) or Great Bear, and assimilated into Wenchang Jundi.

== Worship ==
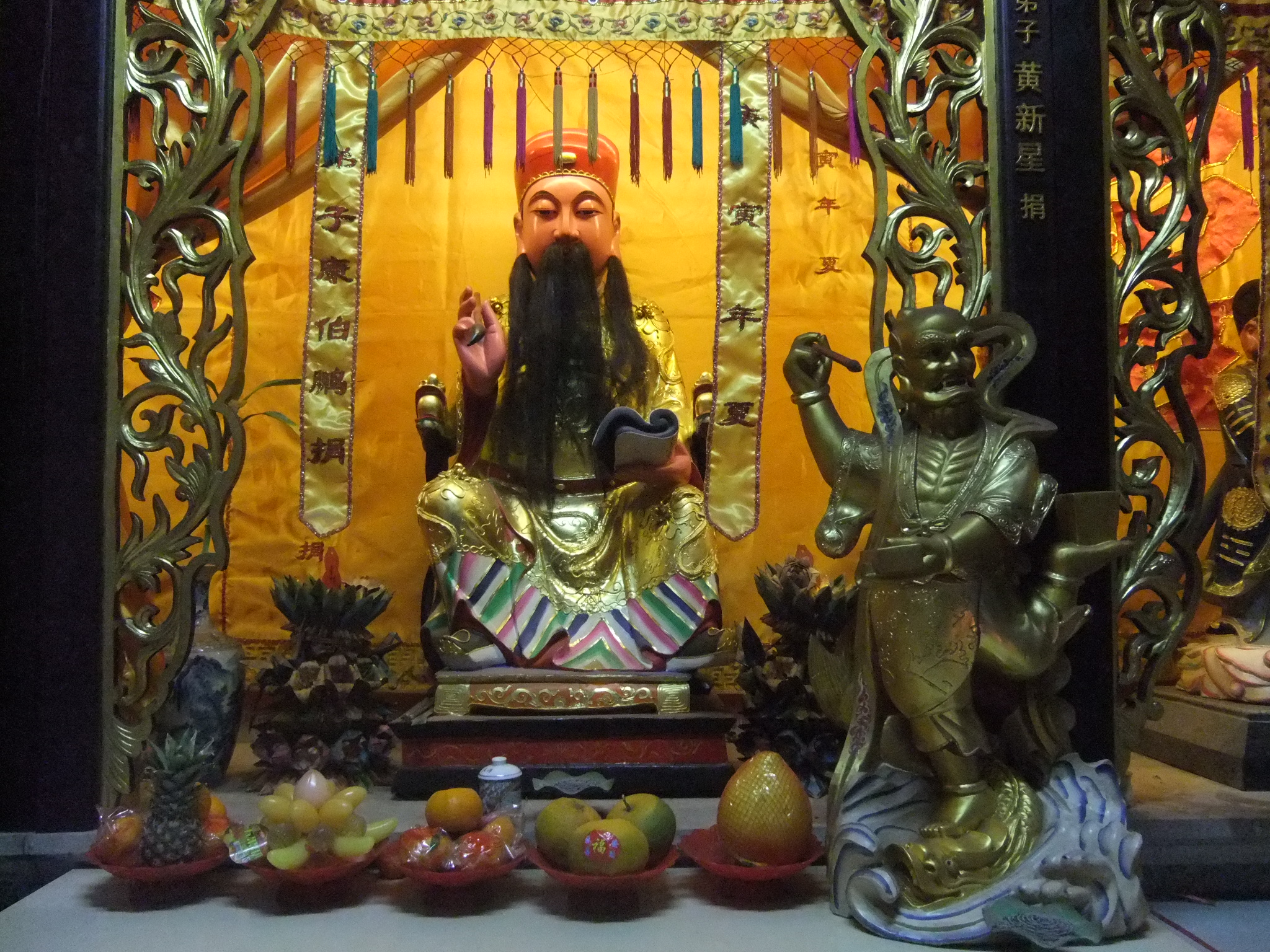
Zitong altar in a temple of Quanzhou, Fujian. To his left there is a statue of Kuixing.

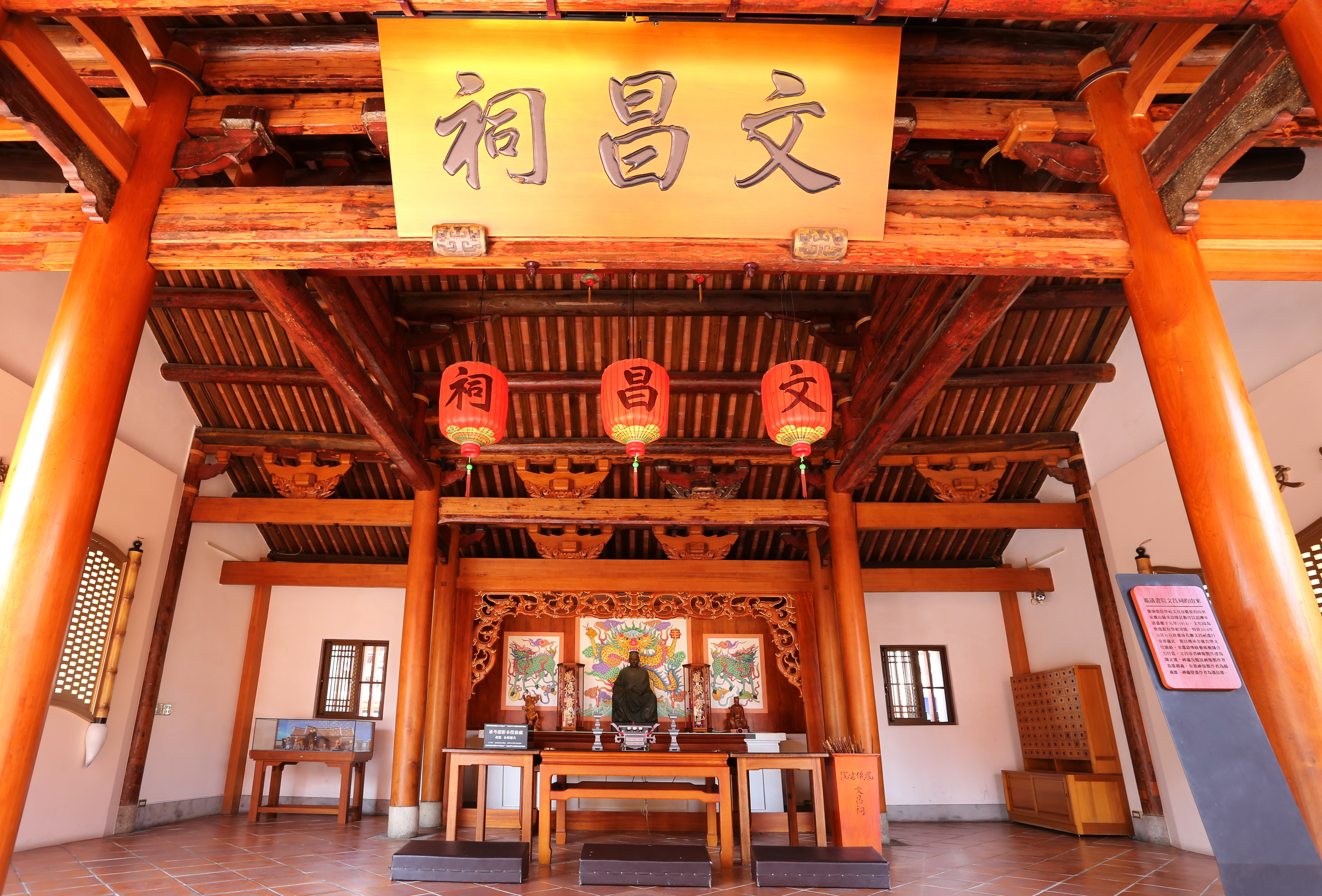
Wenchang Shrine of the Fongyi Tutorial Academy, Fongshan District, Kaohsiung City, Taiwan.

Wenchang has had various titles, but was officially apotheosized by Yen Yu of the Mongol Dynasty in 1314 A.D as the Supporter of the Yuan (Mongol) Dynasty, Diffuser of Renovating Influences, Ssu-lu of Wenchang, God and Lord.

He is often called upon by scholars and students for academic help. There are many different temples and shrines dedicated to worshiping Wenchang Wang, the most notable being the Wenchang temple of Zitong, located at modern-day Qiqu Mountain (七曲山). This famous mountain is both the location of the largest cypress forest in China as well as the origin of the Wenchang culture. As Sichuan (where Qiqu Mountain is located) is mainly in the south, there is a saying, "In the North there is Confucius and in the South there is Wenchang."

There are also two notable temples dedicated to worshiping Wenchang Di Jun in Taichung: one is in the Beitun District of Taichung, apparently constructed in 1863 as a means of facilitating learning in the developing groups of people there. The other temple is in the Nantun district of Taichung, built in 1825. Both temples face south, which is apparently due to a principle of feng shui.

The practice of worshiping Wenchang Wang has a long history; it was popular in the past because he was allowed to be venerated by the rich and poor alike. He is still often worshiped now for essentially the same reasons. The third day of the second month of the Chinese lunar calendar is the birthday of Wenchang. People generally celebrated his birthday by visiting his temples, the officials and scholars of the county all had to go to the Temple of Wenchang to make offerings, sacrifices or recite poems.

== See also ==
- Imperial examination in Chinese mythology
- Wen Wu temple
