= Beitun Wenchang Temple =

Chinese temple in Beitun, Taichung, Taiwan

- 北屯文昌廟
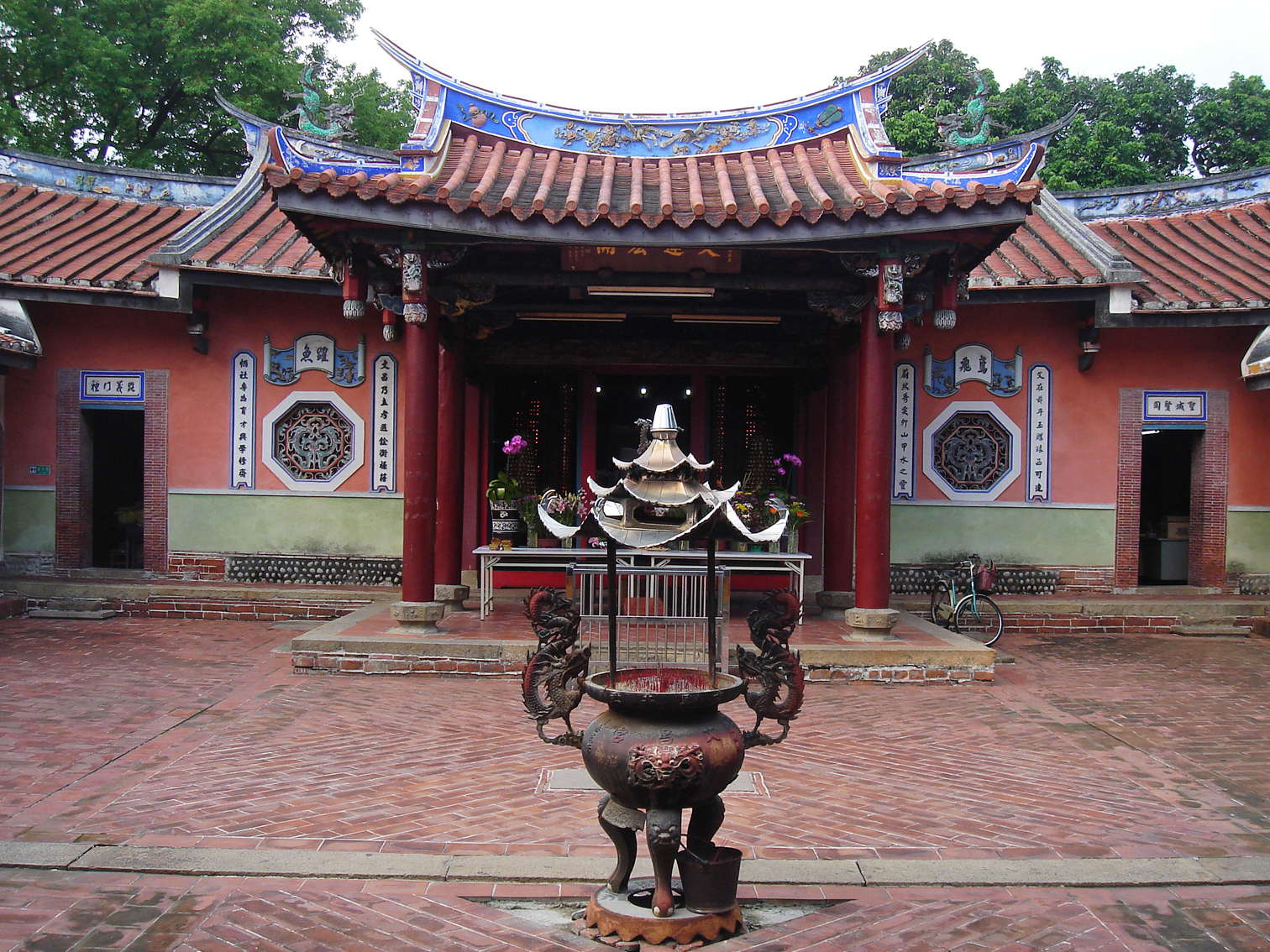

- Location within Taichung

Location
- Location: Beitun, Taichung, Taiwan
- Interactive map of Beitun Wenchang Temple
- Coordinates: 24°11′27.4″N 120°41′05.1″E

Architecture
- Type: temple
- Groundbreaking: 1825
- Completed: 1871

The Beitun Wenchang Temple (traditional Chinese: 北屯文昌廟; simplified Chinese: 北屯文昌庙; pinyin: Běitún Wénchāng Miào) is a temple in Renmei Village, Beitun District, Taichung, Taiwan.

== History ==
The construction planning for the temple began in 1825. In 1864, the Wenwei and Wenping community school raised funds to construct the temple to raise the cultural standards, promote Confucianism, improve local literacy, train scholars for the imperial examinations and encourage education in the area. The temple was completed in 1871 as a Confucian Temple, retaining the two original shrines in name, operation and assets distribution, which were the Wenwei and Wenbing Shrines. Extra funds were also raised to purchase the temple land and agricultural process went towards the temple expenses and staffs salary.

During the Japanese rule of Taiwan, the temple was changed to Wenchang Temple. In 1904, the Japanese took over the wing and converted into a public school, which today becomes the Beitun Elementary School. The left and right studios were converted to teacher dormitories. In April 1996, the Taichung City Government made reparation by commissioning the Architectural Research Center of Tunghai University for the renovation work. The project was completed in March 1998 with a cost of NT$34 million.

== Architecture ==
The temple faces south in a complex which consists of five shrine rooms, two rooms and two wings with small shrines attached to them. The front hall consists of three shrine rooms. The main hall has a four-columned pavilion in front. On the left and right is a low wall that is connected with the classroom in the two wings.

== See also ==
- List of temples in Taichung
- List of temples in Taiwan
- List of tourist attractions in Taiwan
