= Mons (name) =

Mons is used as a surname and a masculine given name. Notable people with the name include:

== Surname ==
- Anna Mons (1672–1714), mistress of Tsar Peter I of Russia
- Chloé Mons (born 1972), French actress and singer
- Evgeny Mons (born 1989), Russian ice hockey player
- Modesta Mons (Matryona Balk, fl. 1718), confidante of Empress-Consort Catherine of Russia
- Pascal Mons, French rugby player
- W. E. R. Mons (1897–1984), British psychiatrist
- Willem Mons (1688–1724), courtier in Saint Petersburg

== Given name ==
- Mons Bassouamina (born 1998), Congolese football player
- Mons Espelid (1926–2009), Norwegian politician
- Mons Haukeland (1892–1983), Norwegian gymnastics teacher and military officer
- Mons Kallentoft (born 1968), Swedish author and journalist
- Mons A. Kårbø (1881–1964), Norwegian politician
- Mons Lid (1896–1967), Norwegian politician
- Mons Lie (1757–1827), Norwegian police chief and writer
- Mons Lie (writer) (1864–1931), Norwegian writer
- Mons Monssen (1867–1930), American sailor of Norwegian origin
- Mons Andreas Petersen (1829–1886), Norwegian farmer
- Mons Røisland (born 1997), Norwegian snowboarder
- Mons Somby, Norwegian Sámi rebellion leader

== See also ==
- Mons family, Dutch family
- Mons (disambiguation)
- Gislebert of Mons (c. 1150 – 1225), clergyman in the County of Hainaut
