= Sergei Saltykov =

Russian officer

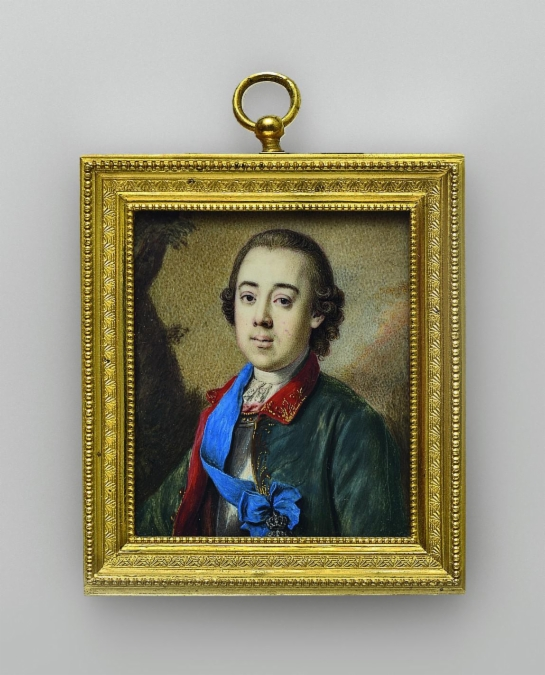
Sergei Saltykov, miniature portrait, Hermitage Museum, Saint Petersburg

Count Sergei Vasilievich Saltykov (Russian: Сергей Васильевич Салтыков, IPA: [sʲɪrˈɡʲej vɐˈsʲilʲjɪvʲɪtɕ səltɨˈkof]; c. 1722 – 1784) was a Russian officer (chamberlain) who became the first lover of Empress Catherine the Great after her arrival in Russia.

== Life ==
Saltykov was alleged to be the biological father of Catherine II's son, Paul I of Russia, which was implied in Catherine's memoirs. It was reported that Paul was "almost certainly the child of [Catherine's] lover". However, Paul greatly resembled his official father Peter III of Russia in character and appearance. There was very little in common between the pugnacious, stocky Paul and tall, handsome Sergei Saltykov. In her memoirs, though, Catherine noted the "ugliness" of Saltykov's brother.

The Saltykovs were an ancient boyar family that rivaled the Romanovs in prominence. Saltykov was also descended from several branches of the Rurikid and Gediminid dynasties through the female line, as well as from Tatiana Feodorovna, the sister of the first Romanov tsar Michael I. Tsarina Praskovia, the mother of Empress Anna, also came from this clan, although her branch was only distantly related to the grandfather of Sergei.

Sergei's wife Matryona Balk was named after her grandmother Modesta Mons, the sister of Anna Mons and Willem Mons. Modesta (better known under her Russian name Matryona) had been publicly whipped in 1718 and exiled to Siberia after Peter the Great had learned about her brother Willem's affair with his wife Catherine.
