= Elizabeth of Russia =

Empress of Russia from 1741 to 1762

Elizabeth
- Tsarina
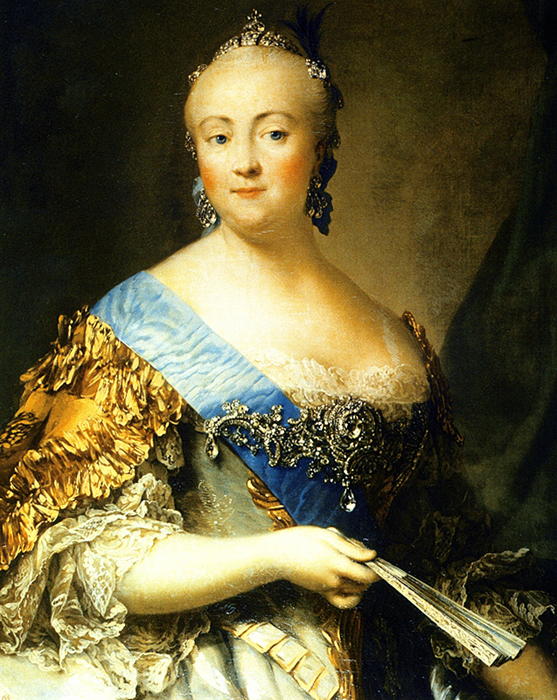
- Portrait by Vigilius Eriksen, 1757

Empress of Russia
- Reign: 6 December 1741 – 5 January 1762
- Coronation: 6 May 1742, Cathedral of Dormition, Moscow
- Predecessor: Ivan VI
- Successor: Peter III
- Born: Grand Duchess Elizaveta Petrovna; 29 December 1709; Kolomenskoye Palace, Moscow, Russian Empire
- Died: 5 January 1762 (aged 52); Winter Palace, Saint Petersburg, Russian Empire
- Burial: 3 February 1762 (O.S.); Peter and Paul Cathedral, Saint Petersburg
- Spouse: Alexei Razumovsky (1742, possible)
Names
- Elizaveta Petrovna Romanova; Russian: Елизаве́та Петро́вна Романова
- House: Romanov
- Father: Peter I of Russia
- Mother: Catherine I of Russia

Elizabeth or Elizaveta Petrovna (Russian: Елизаве́та Петро́вна; 29 December [O.S. 18 December] 1709 – 5 January 1762 [O.S. 25 December 1761]) was Empress of Russia from 1741 until her death in 1762. She is notable among Russian monarchs for her decision not to execute a single person during her reign, her numerous construction projects, and her strong opposition to Prussian policies. She was the last person on the agnatic line of the Romanovs as her nephew ascended, thus creating the house of Holstein-Gottorp-Romanov.

The second-eldest daughter of Tsar Peter the Great (r. 1682–1725), Elizabeth lived through the confused successions of her father's descendants following her half-brother Alexei's death in 1718. The throne first passed to her mother Catherine I of Russia (r. 1725–1727), then to her nephew Peter II, who died in 1730 and was succeeded by Elizabeth's first cousin Anna (r. 1730–1740). After the brief rule of Anna's infant great-nephew, Ivan VI, Elizabeth seized the throne with the military's support and declared her own nephew, the future Peter III, her heir.

During her reign Elizabeth continued the policies of her father. Her domestic policies allowed the nobles to gain dominance in local government while shortening their terms of service to the state.

Elizabeth's early attempts to restore her father's institutions achieved limited legislative progress. According to historian Evgeny Anisimov, she lacked the preparation and inclination for sustained government work, frequently postponing decisions requiring new legislation for years. From the late 1740s, government reforms were increasingly driven by influential courtiers, particularly Pyotr Shuvalov and Ivan Shuvalov. The latter drafted imperial decrees and acted as Elizabeth's principal intermediary with ministers during her final years. Elizabeth rarely attended meetings of the Conference at the Highest Court, appearing only four times in 1756.

Moscow State University was established in 1755 largely through the efforts of Mikhail Lomonosov and Ivan Shuvalov, with Elizabeth signing its founding decree. The Academy of Arts was founded in 1757 on Shuvalov's initiative. Ivan Shuvalov's broader educational reform project of 1760–1761 remained unapproved, partly amid Elizabeth's declining health and the resulting loss of his political support. Elizabeth devoted considerable personal attention to hunting, court entertainments and fashion, issuing detailed decrees regulating courtiers' dress and masquerades.

Elizabeth led the Russian Empire during the two major European conflicts of her time: the War of Austrian Succession (1740–1748) and the Seven Years' War (1756–1763). She and diplomat Aleksey Bestuzhev-Ryumin solved the first event by forming an alliance with Austria and France, but indirectly caused the second. Russian troops enjoyed several victories against Prussia and briefly occupied Berlin, but when Frederick the Great was finally considering surrender in January 1762, the Russian Empress died. She was the last agnatic member of the House of Romanov to reign over the Russian Empire.

== Early life ==
=== Childhood and teenage years ===
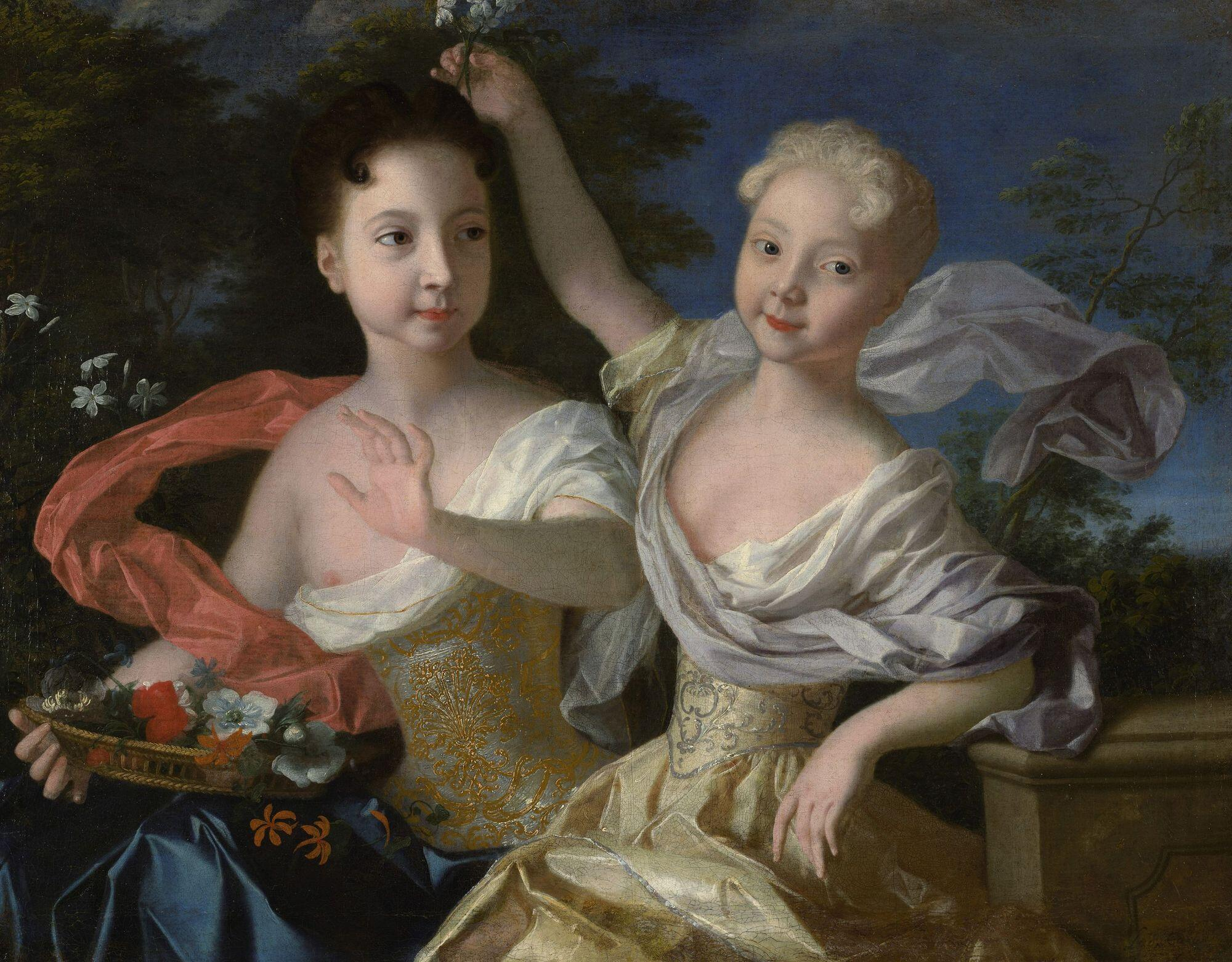
Princesses Anna (left) and Elizabeth, painted by Louis Caravaque in 1717.

Elizabeth was born at Kolomenskoye Palace, near Moscow, Russia, on 18 December 1709 (O.S.). Her parents were Peter the Great, Tsar of Russia and Catherine (later Catherine I of Russia), a washerwoman and housemaid, the daughter of farmer Samuel Skowroński, a subject of Grand Duchy of Lithuania. Although no documentary record exists, her parents were said to have married secretly at the Cathedral of the Holy Trinity in Saint Petersburg at some point between 23 October and 1 December 1707. Their official marriage was at Saint Isaac's Cathedral in Saint Petersburg on 9 February 1712. On this day, the two children previously born to the couple (Anna and Elizabeth) were legitimised by their father and given the title of Tsarevna ("princess") on 6 March 1711. Of the twelve children born to Peter and Catherine (five sons and seven daughters), only the sisters survived to adulthood. They had one older surviving sibling, crown prince, Tsesarevich Alexei Petrovich, who was Peter's son by his first wife, noblewoman Eudoxia Lopukhina.

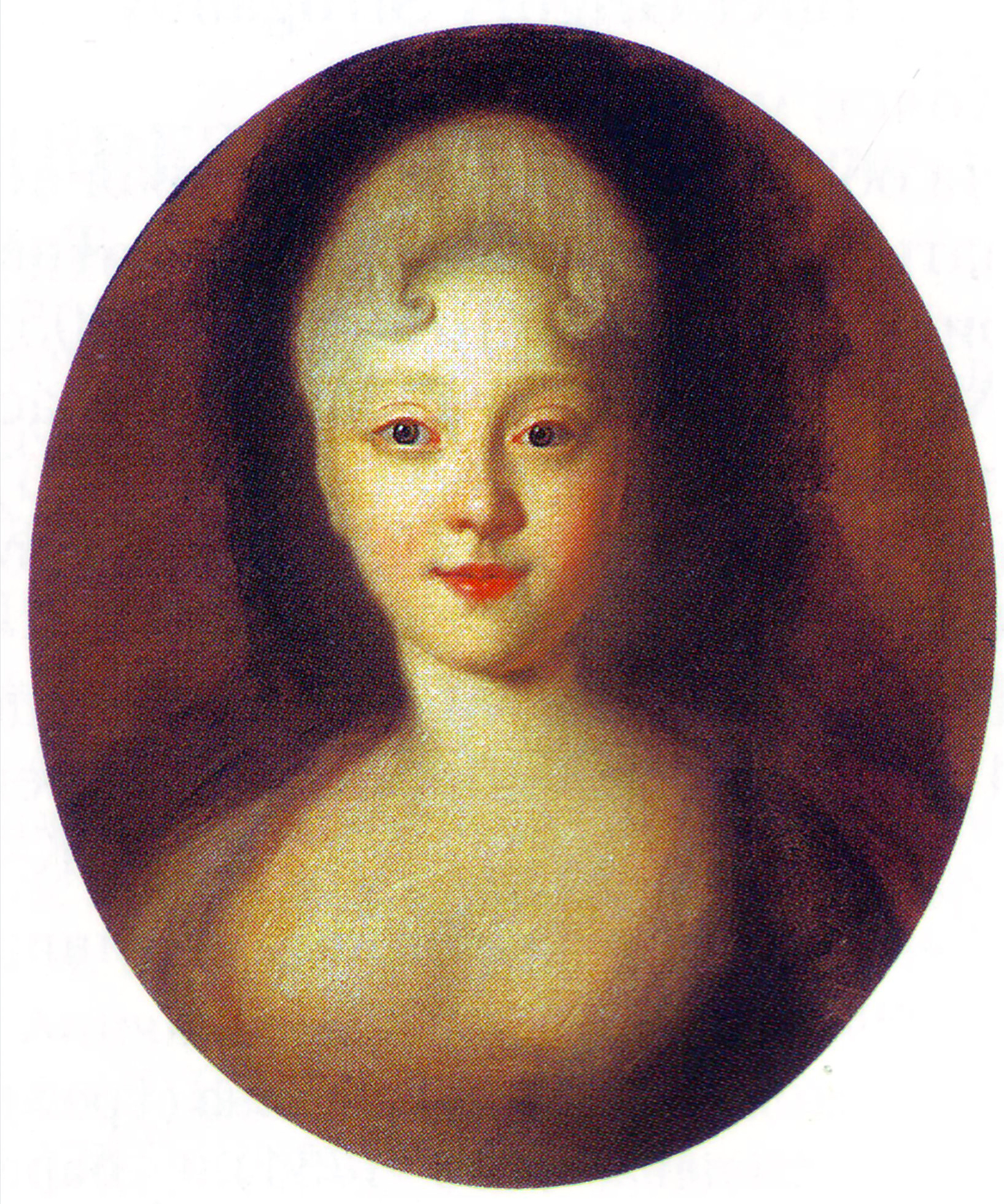
Young Elizabeth in the 1720s, painted by Ivan Nikitich Nikitin.

As a child, Elizabeth was the favourite of her father, whom she resembled both physically and temperamentally. Even though he adored his daughter, Peter did not devote time or attention to her education; having both a son and grandson from his first marriage to a noblewoman, he did not anticipate that a daughter born to his former maid might one day inherit the Russian throne, which had until that point never been occupied by a woman; as such, it was left to Catherine to raise the girls, a task met with considerable difficulty due to her own lack of education. She was illiterate until her early twenties and could not write. Despite this, Elizabeth was still considered to be a clever girl, if not brilliant, and had a French governess who gave lessons in mathematics, arts, languages, and sports. Elizabeth did not receive a systematic education, and, according to Prince Mikhail Mikhailovich Shcherbatov, a publicist of the second half of the 18th century, even in adulthood "did not know that Great Britain was an island". Under the guidance of the Jewish scholar Isaak Pavlovich Veselovsky, she thoroughly studied only French and simultaneously developed a beautiful handwriting. It is to Elizabeth's reign that Russian Gallomania is traditionally dated. The reason that education was conducted in French was due to the desire of her parents to marry Elizabeth into the Bourbon dynasty. She grew interested in architecture, became fluent in Italian and German in addition to French, and became an excellent dancer and rider. Like her father, she was physically active and loved horseriding, hunting, sledging, skating, and gardening.

From her earliest years, Elizabeth was recognised as a vivacious young woman, and was regarded as the leading beauty of the Russian Empire. The wife of the British ambassador described Grand Duchess Elizabeth as "fair, with light brown hair, large sprightly blue eyes, fine teeth and a pretty mouth. She is inclinable to be fat, but is very genteel and dances better than anyone I ever saw. She speaks German, French and Italian, is extremely gay, and talks to everyone ..."

=== Marriage plans ===
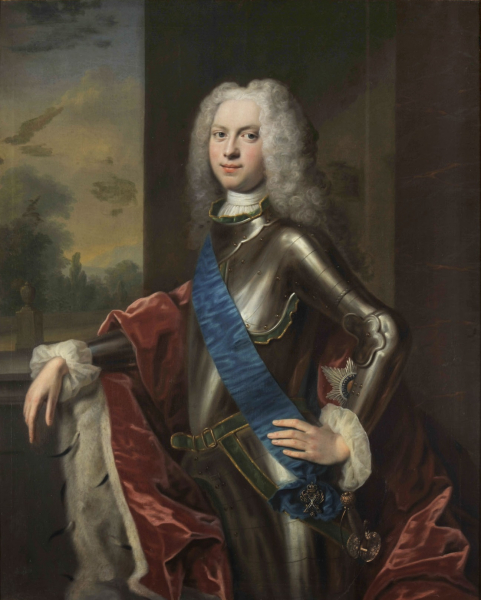
Portrait of her fiancé, Charles Augustus of Holstein-Gottorp (1706-1727), Prince-Bishop of Lübeck, ca. 1725.

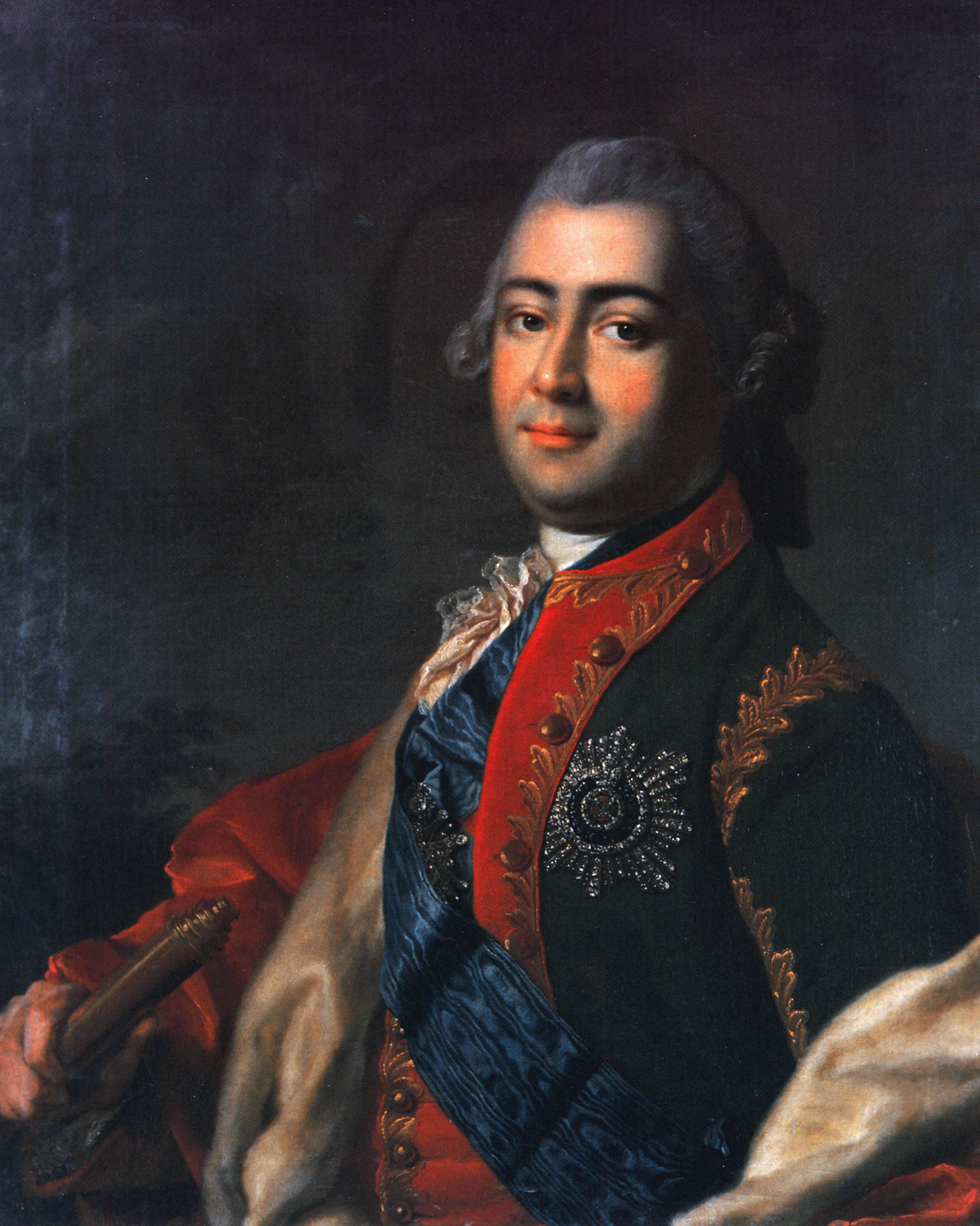
Elizabeth probably secretly married Alexei Razumovsky, a Ukrainian-born chorister.

With much of his fame resting on his effective efforts to modernise Russia, Tsar Peter desired to see his children married into the royal houses of Europe, something which his immediate predecessors had consciously tended to avoid. Peter's son, Tsesarevich Aleksei Petrovich, born of his first marriage to a Russian noblewoman, had no problem securing a bride from the ancient house of Brunswick-Lüneburg. However, the Tsar experienced difficulties in arranging similar marriages for the daughters born of his second wife. When Peter offered either of his daughters in marriage to the future Louis XV, her peer, or to the young Duke Louis of Orléans, the Bourbons of France snubbed him due to the girls' post-facto legitimisation, and their mother, a Livonian commoner of low birth.

No suitable groom could be found for Grand Duchess Elizabeth Petrovna. Candidates included August II the Strong's illegitimate son, Count Maurice de Saxe, who had already been unsuccessfully courted by Empress Anna, Prince George Augustus of England, Charles Friedrich Albrecht, Margrave of Brandenburg-Schwedt, Manuel of Portugal [who?], and even the Shah of Persia, Nader Shah. Elizabeth's illegitimate birth (her parents had officially married in 1712 when she was four years old) prevented her from marrying into the ruling dynasties, as did religious differences and her mother's lowly lineage.

In 1724, Peter betrothed his daughters to two young princes, first cousins to each other, who hailed from the tiny north German principality of Holstein-Gottorp and whose family was undergoing a period of political and economic turmoil. Anna Petrovna (aged 16) was to marry Charles Frederick, Duke of Holstein-Gottorp, who was then living in exile in Russia as Peter's guest after having failed in his attempt to succeed his maternal uncle as King of Sweden and whose patrimony was at that time under Danish occupation. Despite all this, the prince was of impeccable birth and well-connected to many royal houses; it was a respectable and politically useful alliance. In the same year, Elizabeth was betrothed to marry Charles Frederick's first cousin, Prince-Bishop of Lübeck, Charles Augustus of Holstein-Gottorp, the eldest son of Prince-Bishop of Lübeck, Christian Augustus of Holstein-Gottorp, Prince of Eutin. Anna Petrovna's wedding took place in 1725 as planned, even though her father had died 8 February [O.S. 28 January] 1725, a few weeks before the nuptials. In Elizabeth's case, however, her fiancé fell gravely ill and died in Saint Petersburg at the age of 20, on 31 May 1727, in the midst of wedding preparations before her wedding could be celebrated. This came as a double blow to Elizabeth, because her mother, who had ascended to the throne as Catherine I, had died just two weeks previously, on 17 May 1727.

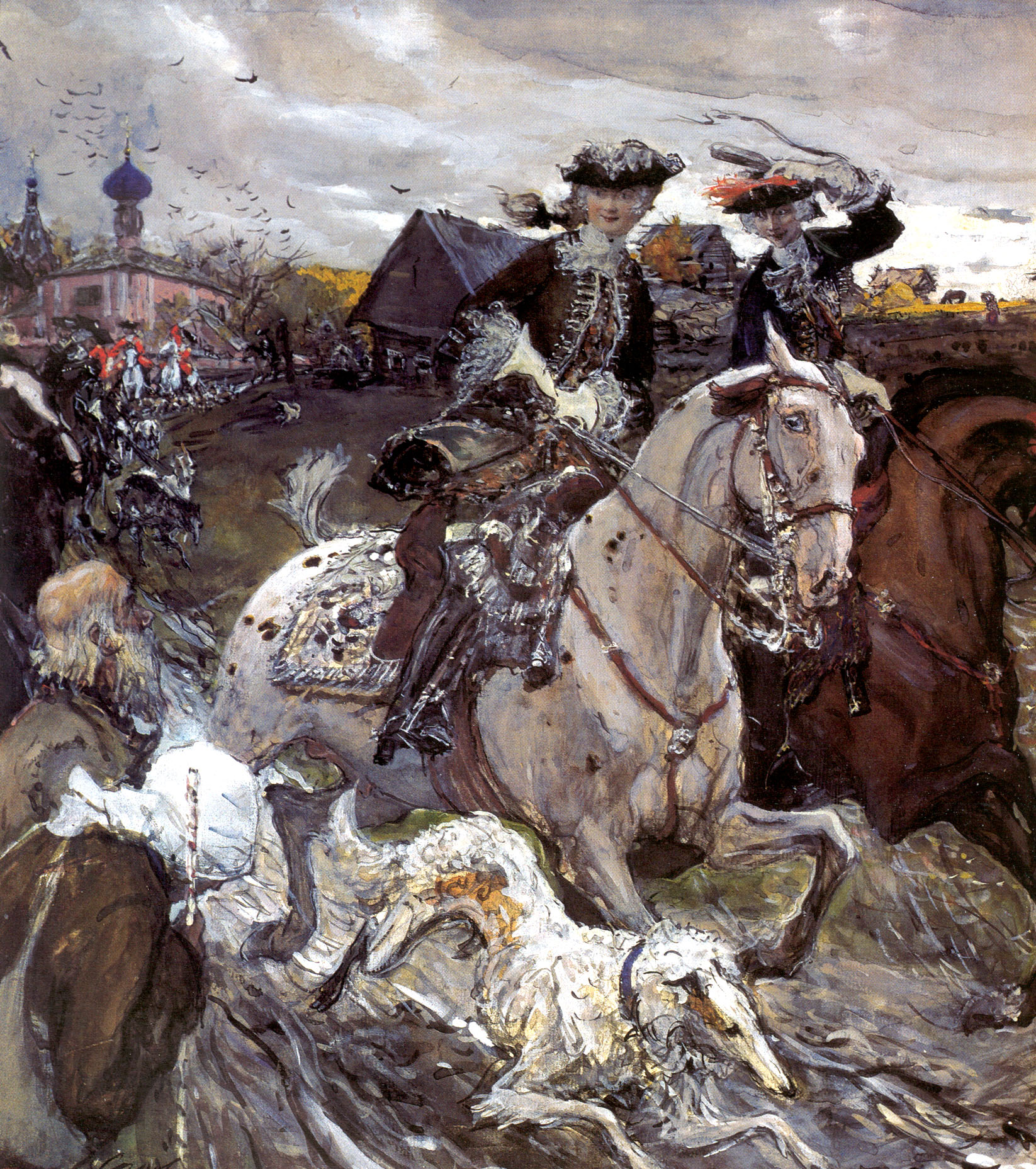
Peter II and Princess Elizabeth Petrovna Riding to Hound by Valentin Serov

By the end of May 1727, 17-year-old Elizabeth had lost her fiancé and both of her parents. Furthermore, her half-nephew Peter II had ascended the throne. Her marriage prospects continued to fail to improve three years later, when her nephew died and was succeeded on the throne by Elizabeth's first cousin Anna, daughter of Ivan V. There was little love lost between the cousins and no prospect of either any Russian nobleman or any foreign prince seeking Elizabeth's hand in marriage. Nor could she marry a commoner because it would cost her royal status, property rights and claim to the throne. The fact that Elizabeth was something of a beauty did not improve marriage prospects, but instead earned her resentment. When the Empress Anna asked the Chinese minister in Saint Petersburg to identify the most beautiful woman at her court, he pointed to Elizabeth, much to Anna's displeasure.

Elizabeth's response to the lack of marriage prospects was to take Alexander Shubin, a sergeant in the Semyonovsky Life Guards Regiment, as her lover. When Empress Anna found out about this, she banished him to Siberia. After consoling herself, Elizabeth turned to coachmen and footmen for her sexual pleasure. She eventually found a long-term companion in Alexei Razumovsky, a kind-hearted Ukrainian Cossack with a good bass voice. Razumovsky had been brought from his village to Saint Petersburg by a nobleman to sing for a church choir, but the Grand Duchess purchased the talented serf from the nobleman for her own choir. A simple-minded man, Razumovsky never showed interest in affairs of state during all the years of his relationship with Elizabeth, which spanned from the days of her obscurity to the height of her power. As the couple was devoted to each other, there is reason to believe that they might even have married in a secret ceremony. In 1742, the Holy Roman Emperor made Razumovsky a count of the Holy Roman Empire. In 1756, Elizabeth made him a prince and field marshal.

== Imperial coup ==
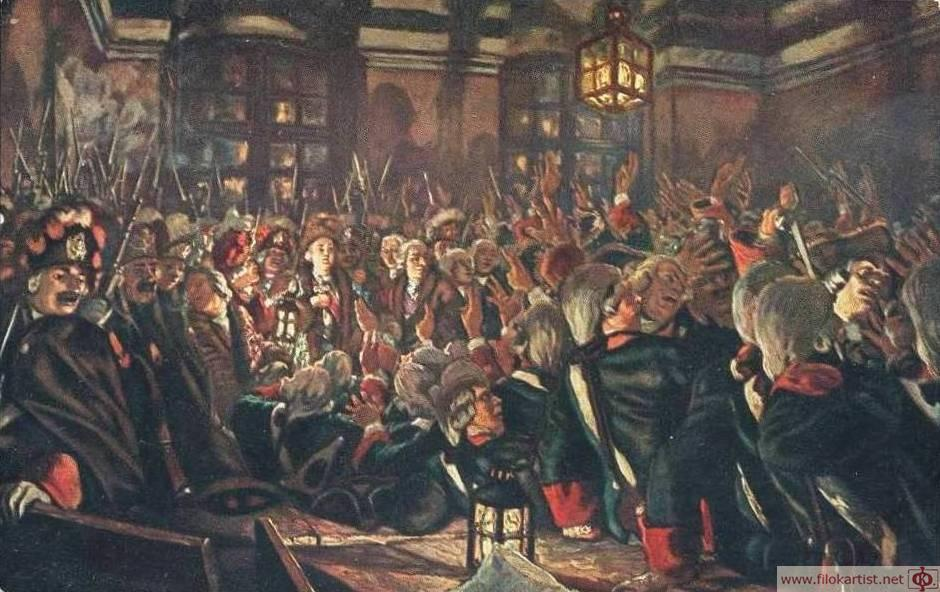
The Preobrazhensky Regiment soldiers proclaim Elizabeth as Empress of Russia.

While Aleksandr Danilovich Menshikov remained in power until September 1727, the government of Elizabeth's adolescent nephew Peter II (reigned 1727–1730) treated her with liberality and distinction. However, the Dolgorukovs, an ancient boyar family, deeply resented Menshikov. With Peter II's attachment to Prince Ivan Dolgorukov and two of their family members on the Supreme State Council, they had the leverage for a successful coup. Menshikov was arrested, stripped of all his honours and properties, and exiled to northern Siberia, where he died in November 1729. The Dolgorukovs hated the memory of Peter the Great and practically banished his daughter from Court.

During the reign of her cousin, Empress Anna (1730–1740), Elizabeth was gathering support in the background. Being the daughter of Peter the Great, she enjoyed much support from the Russian Guards regiments. She often visited the elite Guards regiments, marking special events with the officers and acting as godmother to their children. After the death of Empress Anna, the regency of Anna Leopoldovna for the infant Ivan VI was marked by high taxes and economic problems. The French ambassador in Saint Petersburg, the Marquis de La Chétardie was deeply involved in planning a coup to depose the regent, whose foreign policy was opposed to the interests of France, and bribed numerous officers in the Imperial Guard to support Elizabeth's coup. The French adventurer Jean Armand de Lestocq helped her actions according to the advice of the marquis de La Chétardie and the Swedish ambassador, who were particularly interested in toppling the regime of Anna Leopoldovna.

On the night of 25 November 1741 (O.S.), Elizabeth seized power with the help of the Preobrazhensky Life Guards Regiment. Arriving at the regimental headquarters wearing a warrior's metal breastplate over her dress and grasping a silver cross, she challenged them: "Whom do you want to serve: me, your natural sovereign, or those who have stolen my inheritance?" Won over, the regiment marched to the Winter Palace and arrested the infant Emperor, his parents, and their own lieutenant-colonel, Count Burkhard Christoph von Munnich. It was a daring coup and, amazingly, succeeded without bloodshed. Elizabeth had vowed that if she became Empress, she would not sign a single death sentence, an extraordinary promise at the time but one that she kept throughout her life.

Despite Elizabeth's promise, there was still cruelty in her regime. Although she initially thought of allowing the young tsar and his mother to leave Russia, she imprisoned them later in a Schlüsselburg Fortress, worried that they would stir up trouble for her in other parts of Europe. Fearing a coup on Ivan's favour, Elizabeth set about destroying all papers, coins or anything else depicting or mentioning Ivan. She had issued an order that if any attempt were made for the adult Ivan to escape, he was to be eliminated. Catherine the Great upheld the order, and when an attempt was made, he was killed and secretly buried within the fortress.

Another case was Countess Natalia Lopukhina. The circumstances of Elizabeth's birth would later be used by her political opponents to challenge her right to the throne on grounds of illegitimacy. When Countess Lopukhina's son, Ivan Lopukhin, complained of Elizabeth in a tavern, he implicated his mother, himself and others in a plot to reinstate Ivan VI as tsar. Ivan Lopukhin was overheard and tortured for information. All the conspirators were sentenced to death. The female conspirators had their sentences commuted to having their tongues removed and being publicly flogged. The men were broken on the wheel.

== Reign ==
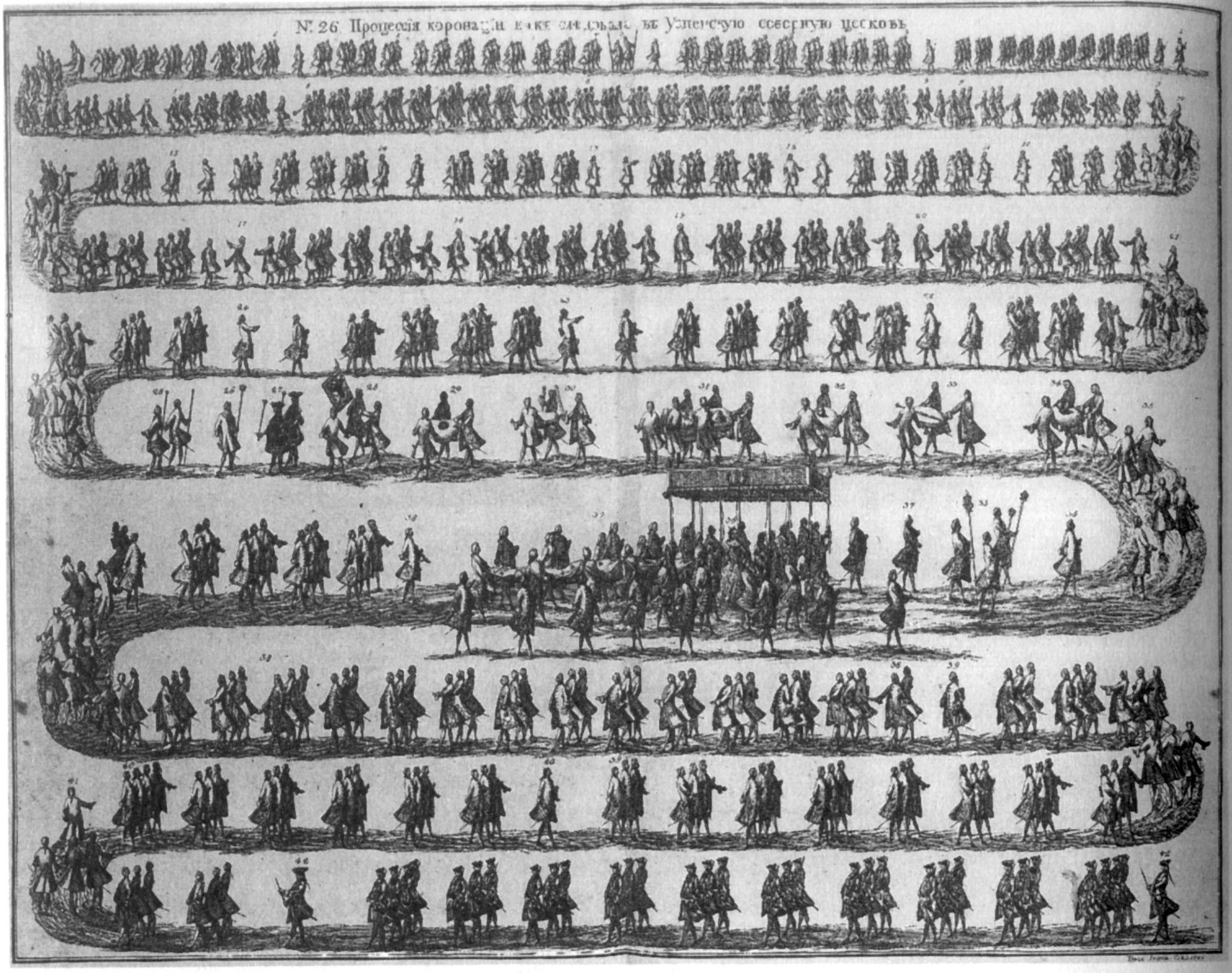
Coronation procession of Empress Elizabeth, in Moscow 1742.

Elizabeth crowned herself Empress in the Dormition Cathedral on 25 April 1742 (O.S.) in Moscow Kreml, which would become standard for all emperors of Russia until 1896. At the age of thirty-three, with relatively little political experience, she found herself at the head of a great empire at one of the most critical periods of its existence. Her proclamation explained that the preceding reigns had led Russia to ruin: "The Russian people have been groaning under the enemies of the Christian faith, but she has delivered them from the degrading foreign oppression."

Russia had been under the domination of German advisers, so Elizabeth exiled the most unpopular of them, including Andrey Osterman and Burkhard Christoph von Münnich. She passed down several pieces of legislation that undid much of the work her father had done to limit the power of the church.

With all her shortcomings (documents often waited months for her signature), Elizabeth occasionally exercised caution in diplomatic affairs, her persistent delays in approving and signing domestic and foreign-policy documents were frequently attributed by contemporaries to her indolence and indecision rather than simply to prudent deliberation. In March 1742, the Prussian envoy Axel von Mardefeld complained that the Empress disliked work, making it extremely difficult to obtain her signature on official documents and leaving government business unfinished. In 1747, the conclusion of a treaty with Austria was delayed despite its terms having already been approved by Elizabeth. In 1758, Chancellor Mikhail Illarionovich Vorontsov complained to the French ambassador, the Marquis de l'Hôpital, that Elizabeth's indecision and procrastination repeatedly obstructed his work, and that even apparently settled matters could be reversed the following day. The historian Mikhail Shcherbatov likewise blamed Elizabeth's indolence for leaving some domestic documents unsigned for years and foreign treaties for months.

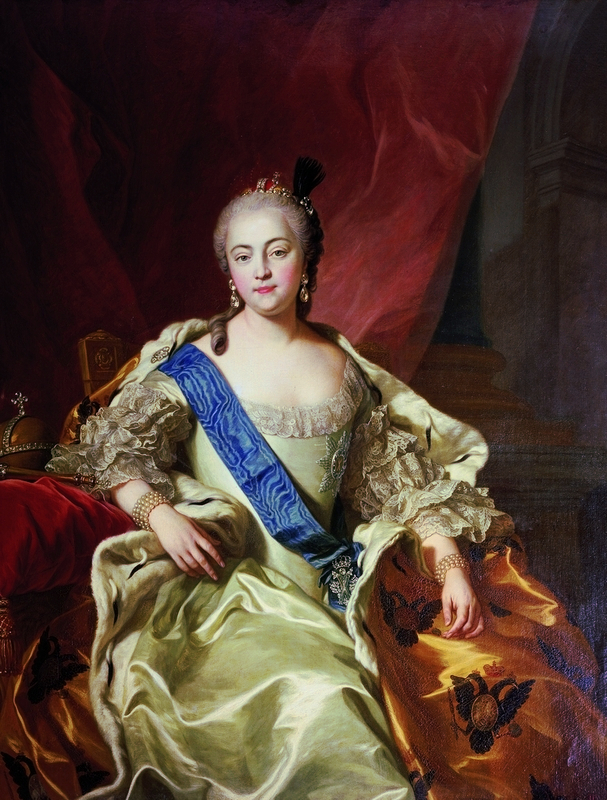
The Elizabeth portrait by Charles-André van Loo in Peterhof Palace

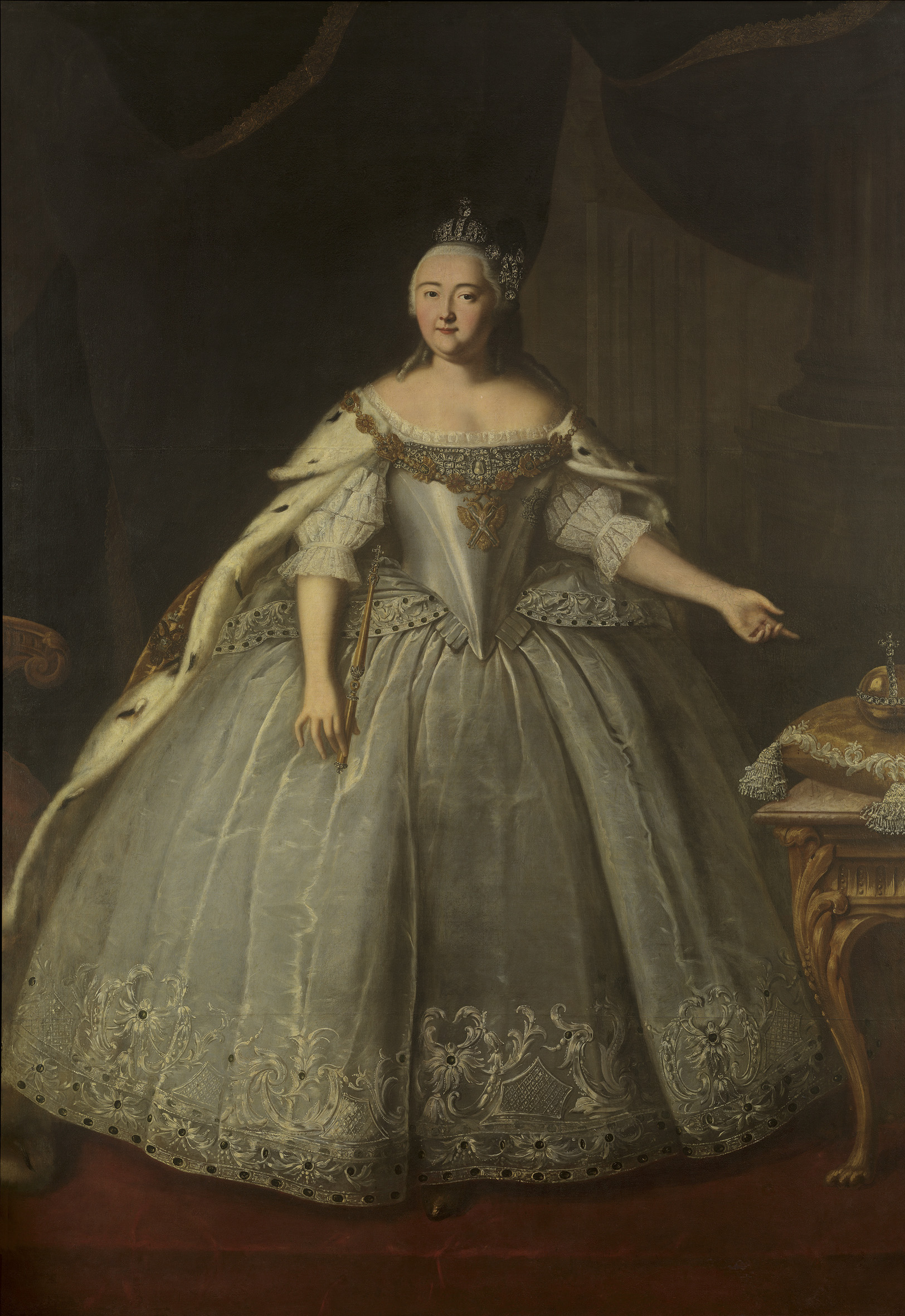
The Elizabeth portrait by Ivan Vishnyakov in Tretyakov Gallery

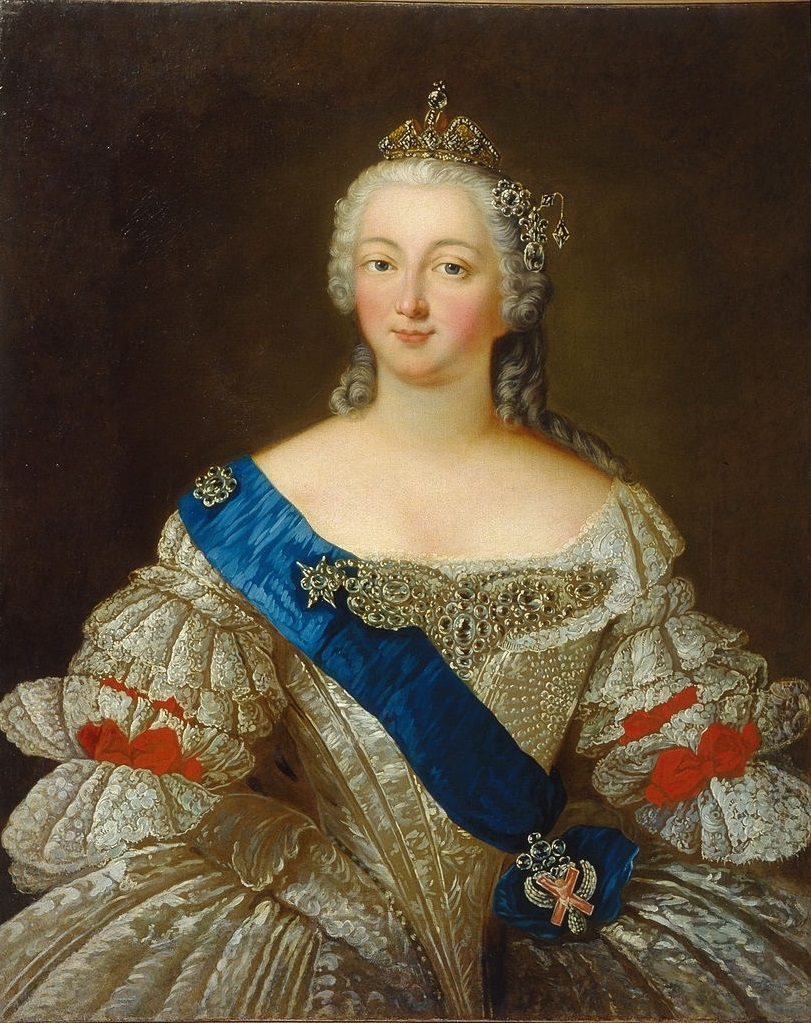
The Elizabeth portrait in Rostov museum

=== Educational reforms ===
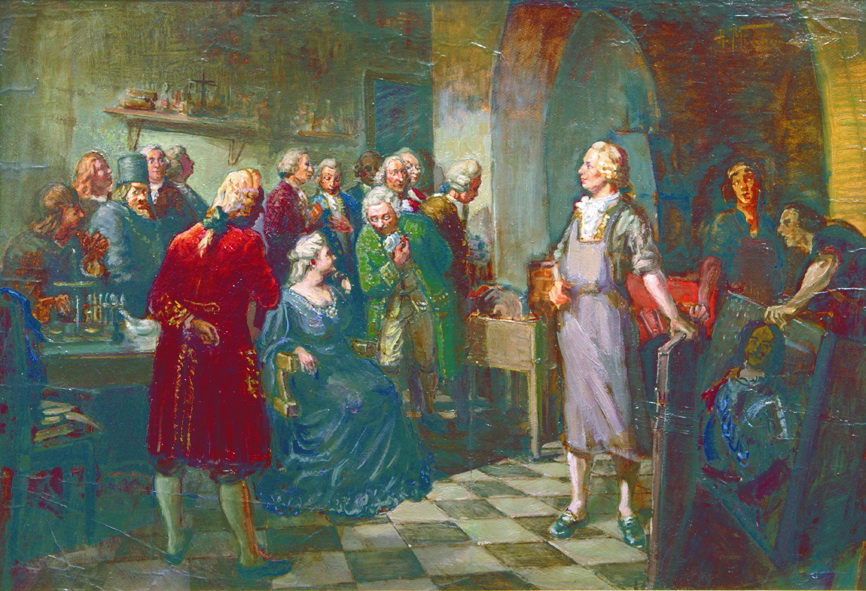
Elizabeth visits Russian scientist Mikhail Lomonosov.

Unlike Peter the Great, Elizabeth lacked the early education necessary to flourish as an intellectual (once finding the reading of secular literature to be "injurious to health"), Nevertheless, through the efforts of her favourite Ivan Shuvalov and the scientist Mikhail Lomonosov, whose education had largely taken place under Anna of Russia within institutions established through Peter's reforms, Moscow State University was founded in 1755, with Elizabeth signing the founding decree.

Despite its significance for Russian higher education, the university initially suffered from limited enrolment, inadequate preparatory schooling, shortages of qualified professors, predominantly Latin-language instruction and internal disputes. Its medical and law faculties were initially almost inactive.

The Academy of Arts was likewise established on Shuvalov's initiative in 1757, initially training a small group of ten pupils in his private residence. It remained subordinate to Moscow University until 1764, when Catherine the Great approved its imperial charter, granted it institutional independence and initiated construction of its purpose-built premises. Moscow University's purpose-built main building was also constructed under Catherine, who allocated 125,000 rubles for the project in 1786.

=== Social welfare ===
Church-based poor relief and almshouses existed in Russia long before Elizabeth's accession. Under Peter I, a decree of 29 July 1723 directed that donations be collected in monasteries, cathedrals and parish churches throughout Russia to fund the construction and maintenance of almshouses.

During Elizabeth's reign, eligibility for institutional poor relief remained subject to restrictions based on social status. In 1744, the authorities ordered that peasants belonging to landowners be returned to their owners, while members of the merchant estate were referred to the municipal magistrates. A Senate resolution of 1753 restricted assistance administered by the Synodal Economic Chancellery to retired servicemen and their wives. Nevertheless, records from 1756 listed 5,416 people in almshouses, exceeding the established capacity. Many of the facilities were overcrowded and in poor condition.

The government also introduced restrictions on the movement and public presence of impoverished and disabled people. A decree of 21 January 1748 prohibited the issuance of travel passes to blind, elderly and disabled peasants seeking to travel to Saint Petersburg and other destinations.

In the spring of 1758, Elizabeth objected to the sight of a woman begging in Saint Petersburg whose face was severely disfigured by wounds. A Senate decree of 13 April subsequently prohibited disabled beggars from soliciting alms in the streets of the capital and ordered their placement in almshouses. It further stipulated that almshouses on Vasilyevsky Island be built away from major streets and routes frequently used by prominent people.

=== Internal peace ===
Imperial monogram, often present in peace treaties.

A gifted diplomat, Elizabeth hated bloodshed and conflict and went to great lengths to alter the Russian system of punishment, even outlawing capital punishment. According to historian Robert Nisbet Bain, it was one of her "chief glories that, so far as she was able, she put a stop to that mischievous contention of rival ambitions at Court, which had disgraced the reigns of Peter II, Anna and Ivan VI and enabled foreign powers to freely interfere in the domestic affairs of Russia."

=== Construction projects ===
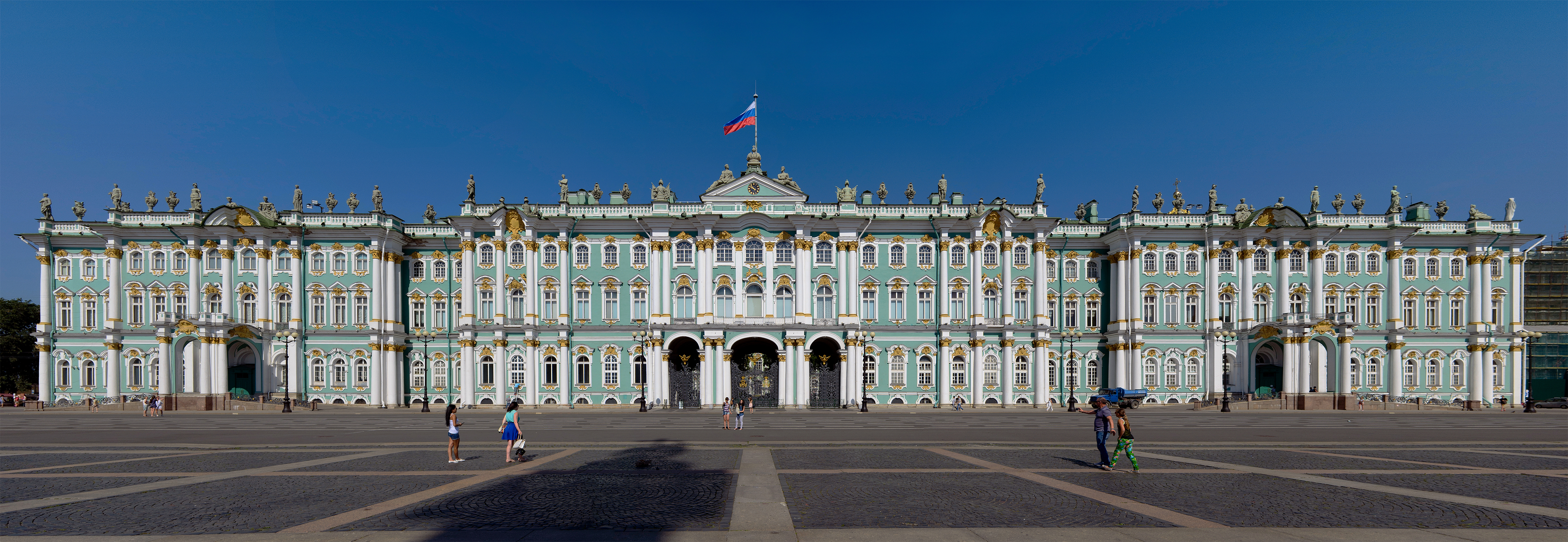
Built by her court architect Bartolomeo Rastrelli, the Winter Palace is Elizabeth's most famous monument and the residence of her successors.

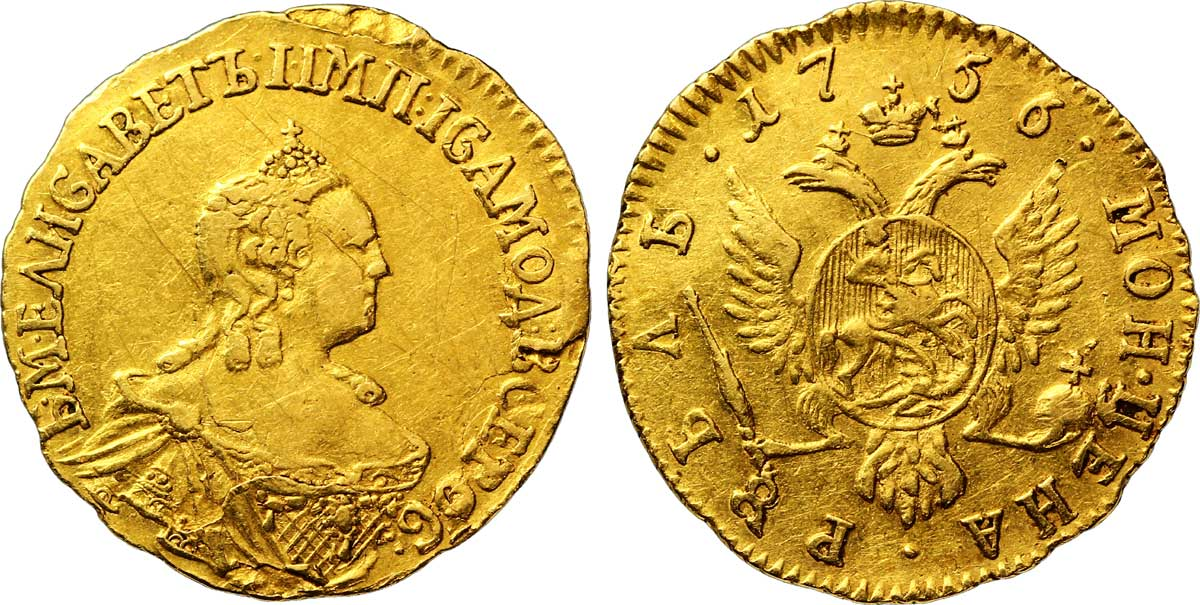
One ruble gold coin (1756) of Elizabeth of Russia, whose beneficial but numerous buildings required heavy taxation.

Elizabeth enjoyed and excelled in architecture, overseeing and financing many construction projects during her reign. One of the many projects from the Italian architect Bartolomeo Rastrelli was the reconstruction of Peterhof Palace, adding several wings between 1745 and 1755. Her most famous creations were the Smolny Convent and the Winter Palace, though she died before its completion. The Palace is said to contain 1,500 rooms, 1,786 doors, and 1,945 windows, including bureaucratic offices and the Imperial Family's living quarters arranged in two enfilades, from the top of the Jordan Staircase. Regarding the Smolny Convent, historian Robert Nisbet Bain stated that "No other Russian sovereign ever erected so many churches."

The expedited completion of buildings became a matter of importance to the Empress and work continued throughout the year, even in winter's severest months. 859,555 rubles had been allocated to the project, a sum raised by a tax on state-owned taverns, but work temporarily ceased due to lack of resources. Ultimately, taxes were increased on salt and alcohol to completely fund the extra costs.Elizabeth's extensive programme of palace construction and court expenditure placed considerable demands on state finances.

=== Selection of an heir ===
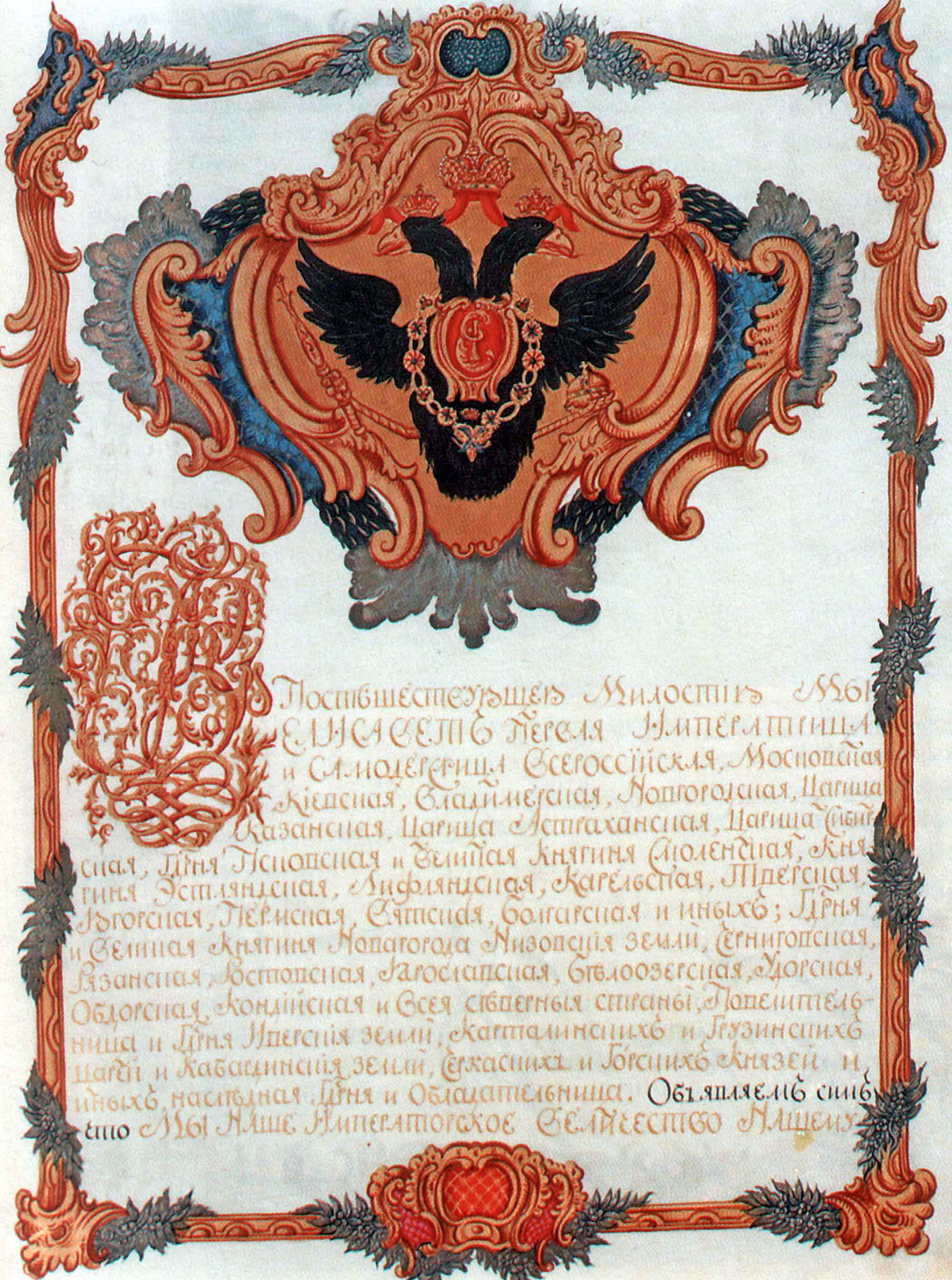
Elisabeth's donation to the Russian lieutenant general Balthasar Freiherr von Campenhausen, 27 May 1756.

As an unmarried and childless empress, it was imperative for Elizabeth to find a legitimate heir to secure the Romanov dynasty. She chose her nephew, Peter of Holstein-Gottorp. The young Peter had lost his mother, Elizabeth's older sister, shortly after he was born, and his father, Charles Frederick, Duke of Holstein-Gottorp, at the age of eleven. Elizabeth invited her young nephew to Saint Petersburg, where he was received into the Russian Orthodox Church and proclaimed the heir to the throne on 7 November 1742. Keen to see the dynasty secured, Elizabeth immediately gave Peter the best Russian tutors and settled on Princess Sophia Augusta Frederica of Anhalt-Zerbst as a bride for her heir. Incidentally, Sophie's mother, Joanna Elisabeth of Holstein-Gottorp, was a sister of Elizabeth's own fiancé, who had died before the wedding. On her conversion to the Russian Orthodox Church, Sophie was given the name Catherine in memory of Elizabeth's mother. The marriage took place on 21 August 1745. Nine years later a son, the future Paul I, was born on 20 September 1754.

There is considerable speculation as to the actual paternity of Paul. It is suggested that he was not Peter's son at all but that his mother had engaged in an affair, to which Elizabeth had consented, with a young officer, Sergei Vasilievich Saltykov, who would have been Paul's biological father. Peter never gave any indication that he believed Paul to have been fathered by anyone but himself but took no interest in parenthood. Elizabeth most certainly took an active interest and acted as if she were his mother, instead of Catherine. Shortly after Paul's birth the Empress ordered the midwife to take the baby and to follow her, and Catherine did not see her child for another month, for a short churching ceremony. Six months later, Elizabeth let Catherine see the child again. The child had, in effect, become a ward of the state and, in a larger sense, the property of the state.

== Foreign policy ==
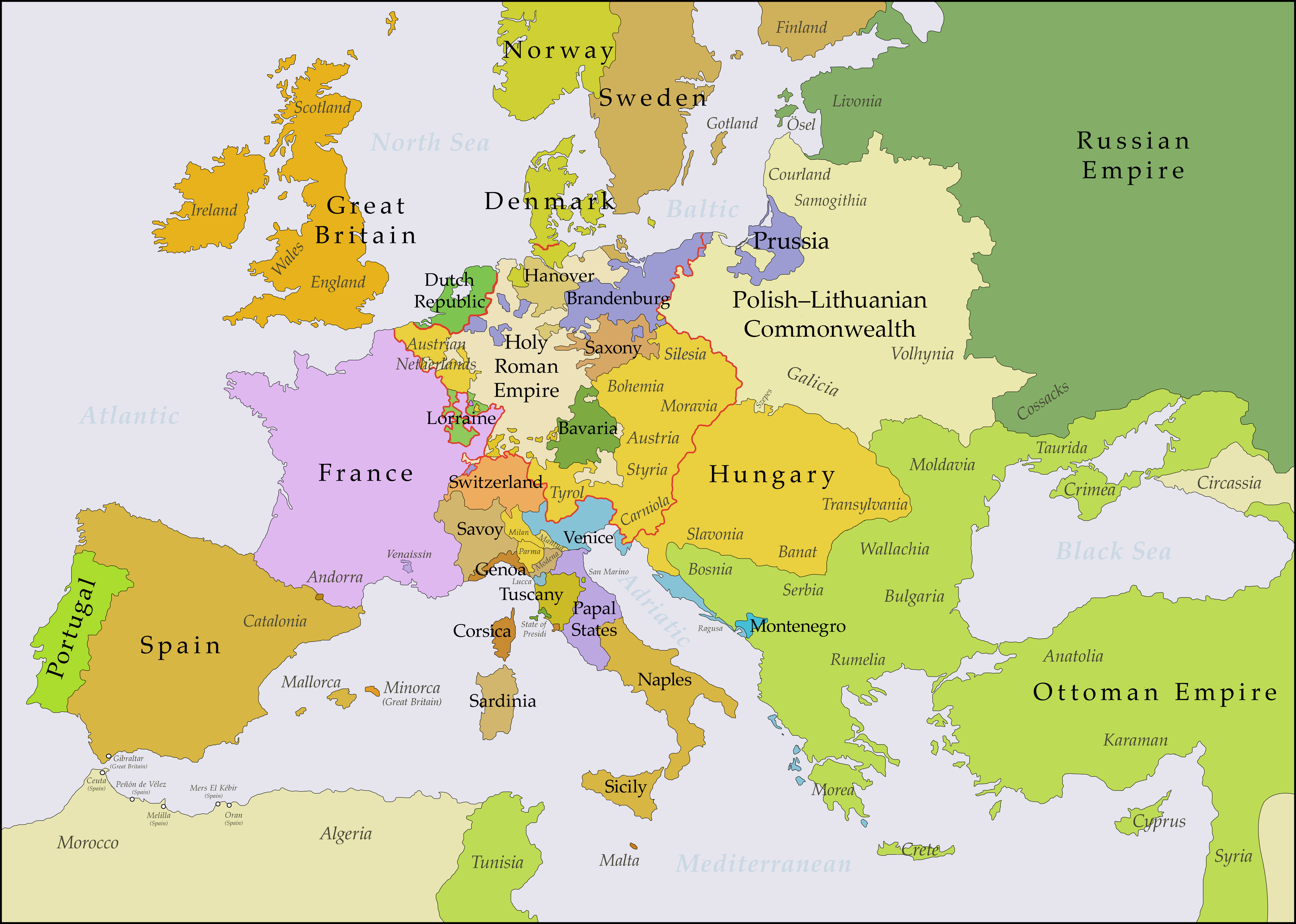
Map of European political borders in 1740.

Elizabeth abolished the cabinet council system that had been used under Empress Anna, and reconstituted the Senate as it had been under Peter the Great, with the chiefs of the departments of state (none of them German) attending. Her first task after this was to address the war with Sweden. On 23 January 1743, direct negotiations between the two powers were opened at Åbo. In the Treaty of Åbo, on 7 August 1743 (O.S.), Sweden ceded to Russia all of southern Finland east of the Kymmene River, which became the boundary between the two states. The treaty also gave Russia the fortresses of Villmanstrand and Fredrikshamn.

=== Bestuzhev ===
The concessions to Russia can be credited to the diplomatic ability of the new vice chancellor, Aleksey Bestuzhev-Ryumin, who had Elizabeth's support. She placed Bestuzhev at the head of foreign affairs immediately after her accession. He represented the anti-Franco-Prussian side of her council, and his objective was an alliance with England and Austria. At that time, it was probably advantageous to Russia. Both the Natalia Lopukhina affair and other attempts of Frederick the Great and Louis XV to get rid of Bestuzhev failed. Instead, they put the Russian court into the centre of a tangle of intrigue during the earlier years of Elizabeth's reign. Ultimately, the minister's strong support from the Empress prevailed.

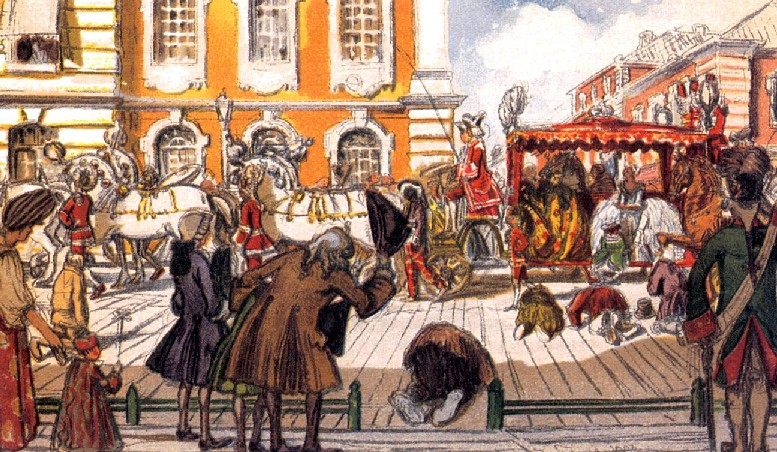
Promenade of Elizaveta Petrovna through the streets of Saint Petersburg (1903), watercolour by Alexandre Benois.

Bestuzhev had many achievements. His effective diplomacy and 30,000 troops sent to the Rhine accelerated the peace negotiations, leading to the Treaty of Aix-la-Chapelle 18 October 1748. He extricated his country from the Swedish imbroglio and reconciled his imperial mistress with the courts of Vienna and London. He enabled Russia to assert herself effectually in Poland, the Ottoman Empire, Sweden and isolated the King of Prussia by forcing him into hostile alliances. All this would have been impossible without the steady support of Elizabeth who trusted him completely in spite of the Chancellor's many enemies, most of whom were her personal friends.

However, on 14 February 1758, Bestuzhev was removed from office. The future Catherine II recorded, "He was relieved of all his decorations and rank, without a soul being able to reveal for what crimes or transgressions the first gentleman of the Empire was so despoiled, and sent back to his house as a prisoner." No specific crime was ever pinned on Bestuzhev. Instead, it was inferred that he had attempted to sow discord between the Empress and her heir and his consort. Enemies of the pro-Austrian Bestuzhev were his rivals; the Shuvalov family, Vice-Chancellor Mikhail Vorontsov, and the French ambassador.

=== Seven Years' War ===
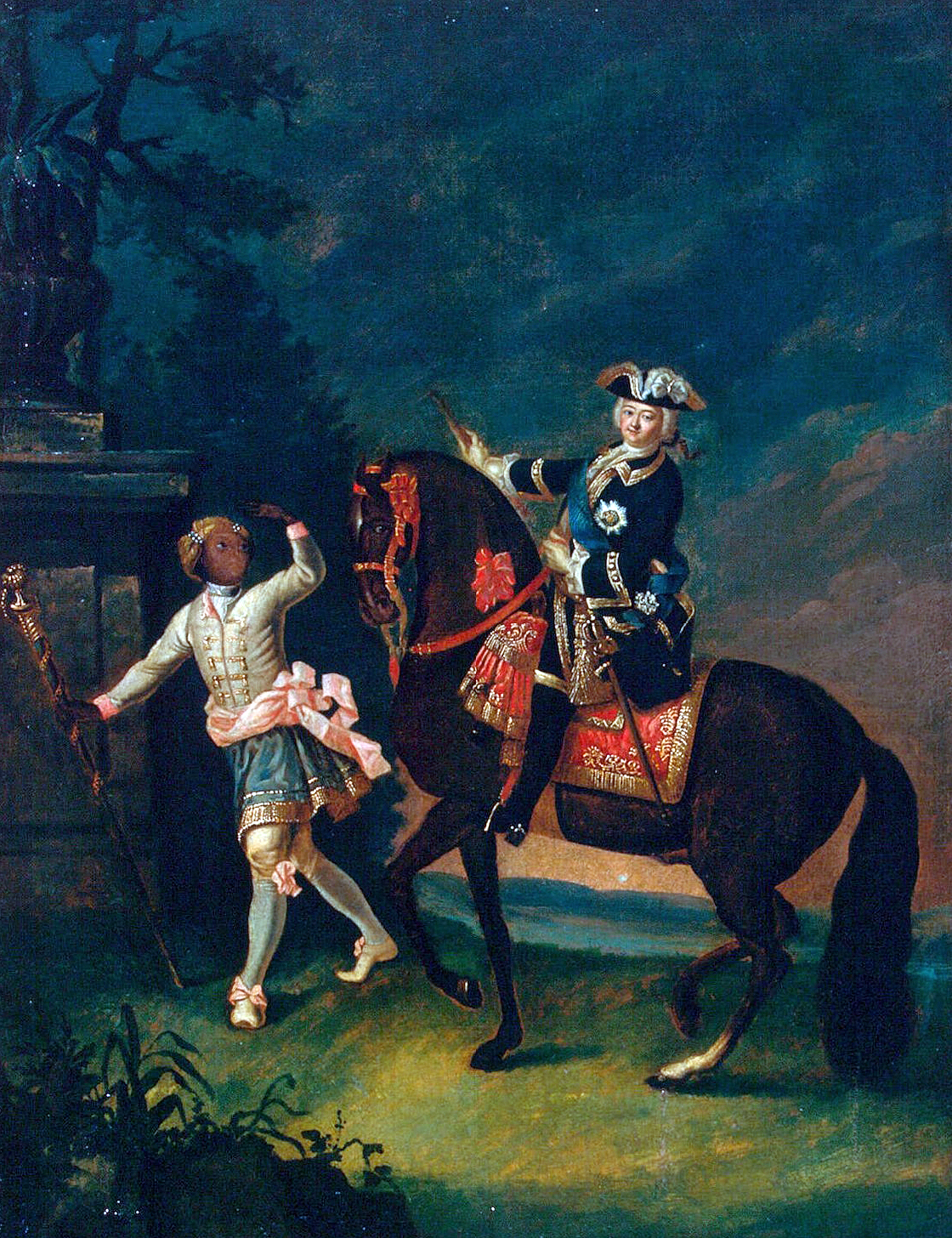
Elizabeth on horseback while being attended by a page.

The great event of Elizabeth's later years was the Seven Years' War. Elizabeth regarded the Convention of Westminster 16 January 1756 in which Great Britain and Prussia agreed to unite their forces to oppose the entry of or the passage through Germany of troops of every foreign power, as utterly subversive of the previous conventions between Great Britain and Russia. Elizabeth sided against Prussia over a personal dislike of Frederick the Great. She wanted him reduced within proper limits so that he might no longer be an alleged danger to the empire. Elizabeth acceded to the Second Treaty of Versailles, thus entering into an alliance with France and Austria against Prussia. On 17 May 1757, the Imperial Russian Army, 85,000 strong, advanced against Königsberg.

The serious illness of the Empress, which began with a fainting-fit at Tsarskoe Selo 19 September 1757, the fall of Bestuzhev 21 February 1758 and the cabals and intrigues of the various foreign powers at Saint Petersburg, did not interfere with the progress of the war. The crushing defeat of Kunersdorf 12 August 1759 at last brought Frederick the Great to the verge of ruin. From that day, he despaired of success, but he was saved for the moment by the jealousies of the Russian and Austrian commanders, which ruined the military plans of the allies.

From the end of 1759 to the end of 1761, the eagerness of the Russian Empress was the one constraining political force that held together the different elements of the anti-Prussian combination. From the Russian point of view, she steadily appreciated Russian interests and was determined to promote them against all obstacles. She insisted throughout that the King of Prussia must be reduced to the rank of a Prince-Elector.

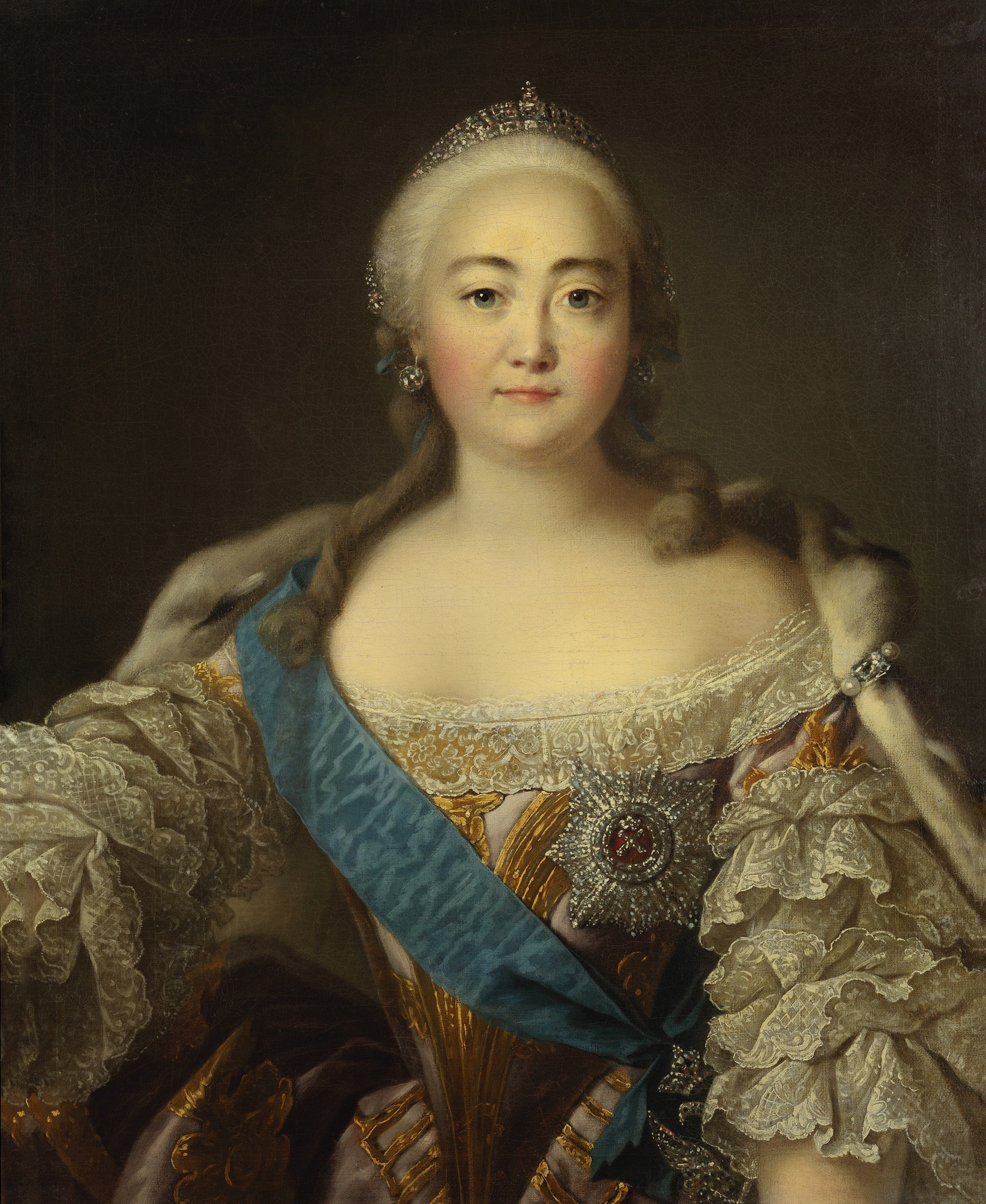
Portrait by Louis Tocqué.

Frederick himself was quite aware of his danger. "I'm at the end of my resources," he wrote at the beginning of 1760. "The continuance of this war means for me utter ruin. Things may drag on perhaps till July, but then a catastrophe must come." On 21 May 1760, a fresh convention was signed between Russia and Austria, a secret clause of which, never communicated to the court of Versailles, guaranteed East Prussia to Russia as an indemnity for war expenses. The failure of the campaign of 1760, wielded by the inept Count Buturlin, induced the court of Versailles on the evening of 22 January 1761 to present to the court of Saint Petersburg a dispatch to the effect that the king of France, by reason of the condition of his dominions, absolutely desired peace. The Russian empress's reply was delivered to the two ambassadors on 12 February. It was inspired by the most uncompromising hostility towards the king of Prussia. Elizabeth would not consent to any pacific overtures until the original object of the league had been accomplished.

Simultaneously, Elizabeth had conveyed to Louis XV a confidential letter in which she proposed the signature of a new treaty of alliance of a more comprehensive and explicit nature than the preceding treaties between the two powers without the knowledge of Austria. Elizabeth's object in the mysterious negotiation seems to have been to reconcile France and Great Britain, in return for which signal service France was to throw all her forces into the attack on Prussia. This project, which lacked neither ability nor audacity, foundered upon Louis XV's invincible jealousy of the growth of Russian influence in Eastern Europe and his fear of offending the Porte. It was finally arranged by the allies that their envoys in Paris should fix the date for the assembling of a peace congress and that in the meantime, the war against Prussia should be vigorously prosecuted. In 1760 a Russian flying column briefly occupied Berlin. Russian victories placed Prussia in serious danger.

The campaign of 1761 was almost as abortive as the campaign of 1760. Frederick the Great acted on the defensive with consummate skill, and the capture of the Prussian fortress of Kolberg on Christmas Day 1761, by Field Marshal Pyotr Rumyantsev, was the sole Russian success. Frederick, however, was now at the last gasp. On 6 January 1762, he wrote to Count Karl-Wilhelm Finck von Finckenstein, "We ought now to think of preserving for my nephew, by way of negotiation, whatever fragments of my territory we can save from the avidity of my enemies." A fortnight later, he wrote to Prince Ferdinand of Brunswick, "The sky begins to clear. Courage, my dear fellow. I have received the news of a great event." The Miracle of the House of Brandenburg that snatched him from destruction was the death of the Russian empress, on 5 January 1762 (N.S.).

=== Siberia ===
In 1742, the imperial government at Saint Petersburg ordered a Russian military expedition to conquer the Chukchi and Koryaks, but the expedition failed and its commander, Major Dmitry Pavlutsky, was killed in 1747. On 12 March 1747, a party of 500 Chukchi warriors raided the Russian stockade of Anadyrsk. By 1750, it had become clear the Chukchi would be difficult to conquer. The Empress then changed her tactical approach and established a formal peace with them.

== Court ==
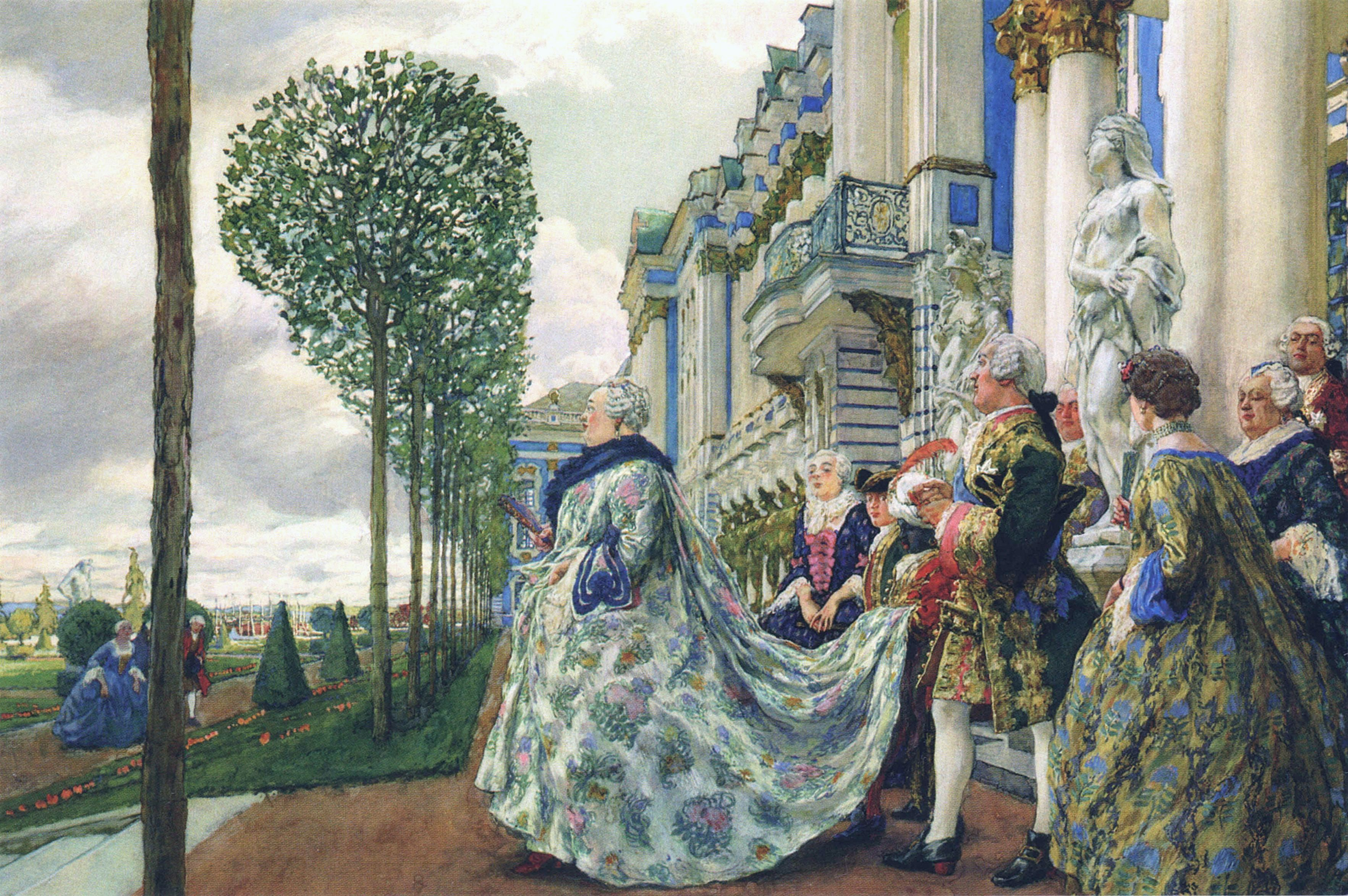
Elizaveta Petrovna in Tsarskoe Selo (1905), painting by Eugene Lanceray, now in the Tretyakov Gallery.

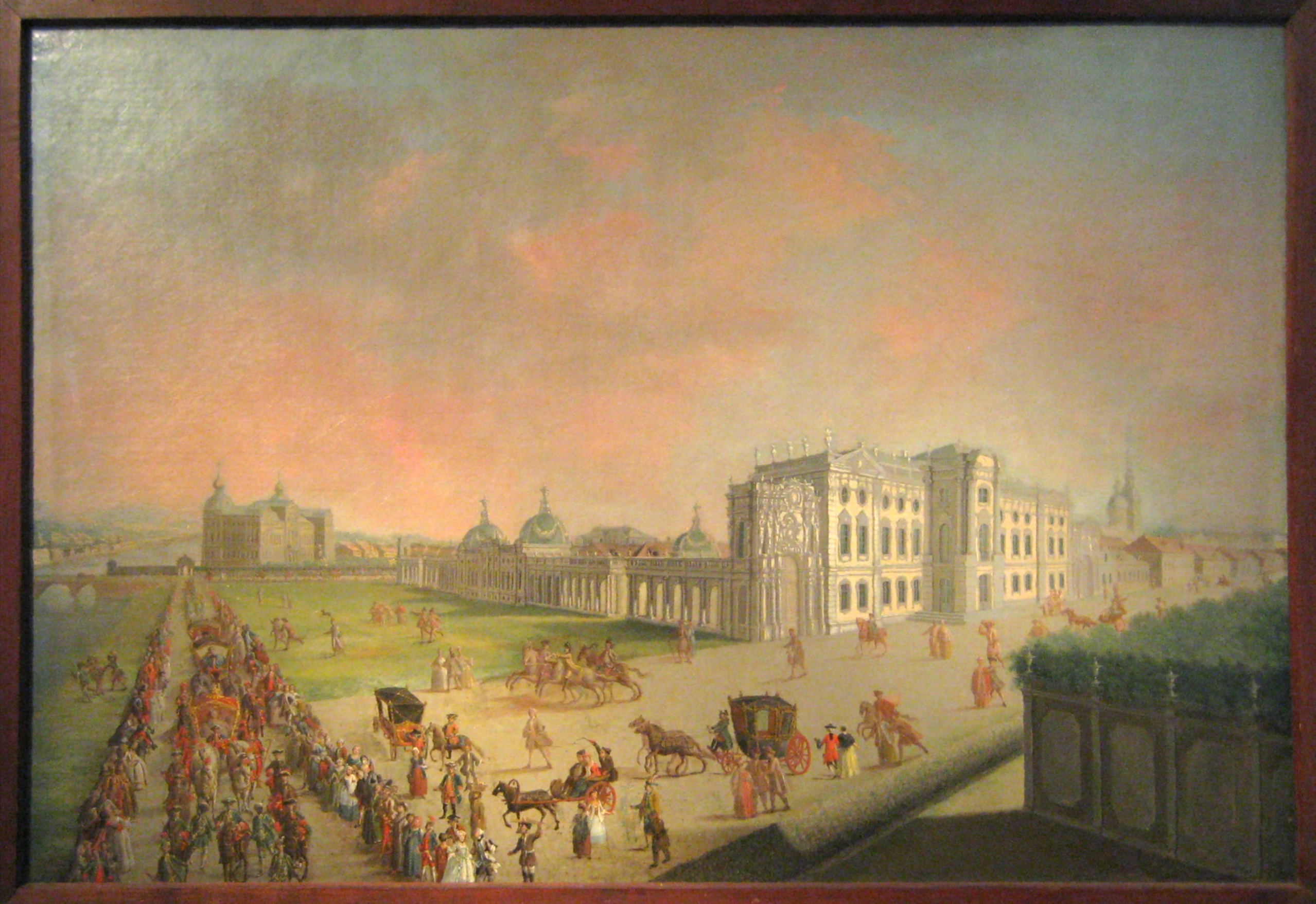
Departure of Elizabeth from Anichkov Palace.

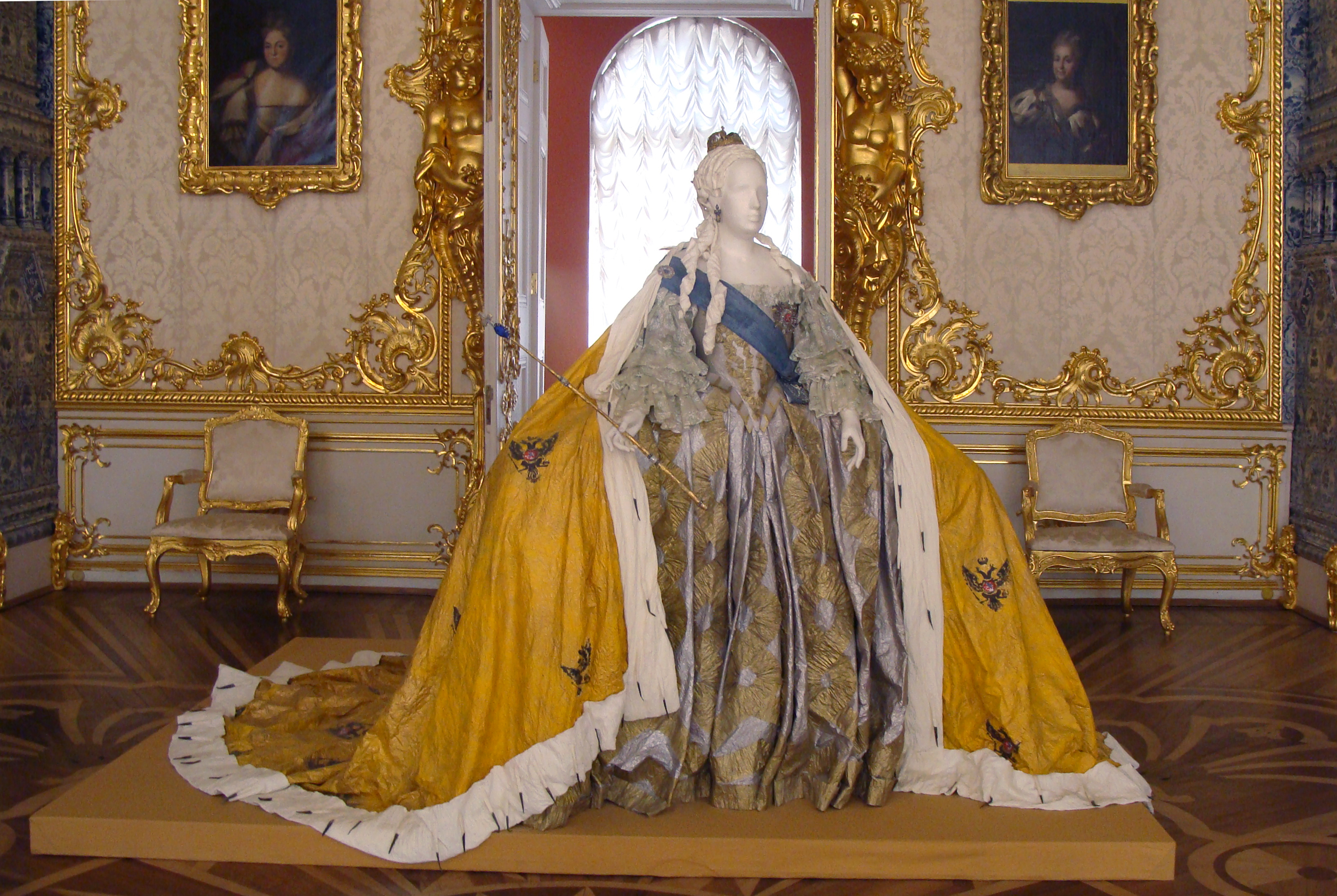
Ceremonial attire of Elizabeth, Catherine Palace, Tsarskoye Selo.

Elizabeth's court was one of the most splendid in all Europe. As historian Mikhail Shcherbatov stated, the court was "arrayed in cloth of gold, her nobles satisfied with only the most luxurious garments, the most expensive foods, the rarest drinks, that largest number of servants and they applied this standard of lavishness to their dress as well". A great number of silver and gold objects were produced, the most the country had seen thus far in its history. It was common to order over a thousand bottles of French champagnes and wines to be served at one event and to serve pineapples at all receptions, despite the difficulty of procuring the fruit in such quantities.

French plays quickly became the most popular and often were performed twice a week. In tandem, music became very important. Many attribute its popularity to Elizabeth's supposed husband, the "Emperor of the Night", Alexei Razumovsky, who reportedly relished music. Elizabeth spared no expense in importing leading musical talents from Germany, France, and Italy. She reportedly owned 15,000 dresses, several thousand pairs of shoes and a seemingly unlimited number of stockings.

Attractive in her youth and vain as an adult, Elizabeth passed various decrees intended to make herself stand out: she issued an edict against anyone wearing the same hairstyle, dress, or accessory as the Empress. One woman accidentally wore the same item as the Empress and was lashed across the face for it. Another law required French fabric salesmen to sell to the Empress first, and those who disregarded that law were arrested. One famous story exemplifying her vanity is that once Elizabeth got a bit of powder in her hair and was unable to remove it except by cutting a patch of her hair. She made all of the court ladies cut patches out of their hair too, which they did "with tears in their eyes". This aggressive vanity became a tenet of the court throughout her reign, particularly as she grew older. According to historian Tamara Talbot Rice, "Later in life her outbursts of anger were directed either against people who were thought to have endangered Russia's security or against women whose beauty rivalled her own".

Despite her volatile and often violent reactions to others regarding her appearance, Elizabeth was ebullient in most other matters, particularly when it came to court entertainment. It was reported that she threw two balls a week; one would be a large event with an average of 800 guests in attendance, most of whom were the nation's leading merchants, members of the lower nobility and guards stationed in and around the city of the event. The other ball was a much smaller affair reserved for her closest friends and members of the highest echelons of nobility. The smaller gatherings began as masked balls, but evolved into the famous metamorphoses balls by 1744. At these metamorphoses balls, guests were expected to dress as the opposite sex, with Elizabeth often dressing up as Cossack or carpenter in honour of her father. Costumes not permitted at the event were those of pilgrims and harlequins, which she considered profane and indecent respectively. Most courtiers thoroughly disliked the balls, as most guests by decree looked ridiculous, but Elizabeth adored them; as Catherine the Great posited, this was because she was "the only woman who looked truly fine and completely a man.... As she was tall and possessed a powerful body, male attire suited her". Catherine also noted that Elizabeth had beautiful legs, and loved to wear male attire because of the tight trousers.

== Death ==
In the late 1750s, Elizabeth's health started to decline. She suffered a series of dizzy spells and refused to take the medication she had been prescribed. The Empress forbade the word "death" in her presence until she suffered a stroke on 24 December 1761 (O.S.). Knowing that she was dying, Elizabeth used her last remaining strength to make her confession, to recite with her confessor the prayer for the dying, and to say farewell to the few people who wished to be with her, including Peter and Counts Alexei and Kirill Razumovsky.

The Empress died the next day, Orthodox Christmas, 1761 at Winter Palace. For her lying in state, she was dressed in a shimmering silver dress. It was said that she was beautiful in death as she had been in life. She was buried in the Peter and Paul Cathedral in Saint Petersburg on 3 February 1762 (O.S.) six weeks after her lying in state.

== See also ==
- Bibliography of Russian history (1613–1917)
- Family tree of Russian monarchs

Elizabeth of Russia House of Romanov Born: 29 December 1709 Died: 5 January 1762
Regnal titles
Preceded by Ivan VI	Empress of Russia; 6 December 1741 – 5 January 1762	Succeeded by Peter III
