= Mons =

Mons commonly refers to:

- Mons, Belgium, a city in Wallonia, Belgium
- Mons pubis (mons Venus or mons veneris), in mammalian anatomy, the adipose tissue lying above the pubic bone
- Mons (planetary nomenclature), a sizable extraterrestrial mountain
- Battle of Mons, a 1914 World War I battle in Mons, Belgium

Mons or MONS may also refer to:

== Places ==
- Mons, Queensland, Australia, a suburb of the Sunshine Coast
- Mons, Graubünden, Switzerland, a village

=== France ===
- Mons, Charente, a commune in the Charente département
- Mons, Charente-Maritime, a commune in the Charente-Maritime département
- Mons, Gard, a commune in the Gard département
- Mons, Haute-Garonne, a commune in the Haute-Garonne département
- Mons, Hérault, a commune in the Hérault département
- Mons, Puy-de-Dôme, a commune in the Puy-de-Dôme département
- Mons, Var, a commune in the Var département
- Mons-Boubert, a commune in the Somme département
- Mons-en-Barœul, a commune in the Nord département
- Mons-en-Laonnois, a commune in the Aisne département
- Mons-en-Montois, a commune in the Seine-et-Marne département
- Mons-en-Pévèle, a commune in the Nord département

== People ==
- Mons (name), list of people with the name

== Other uses ==
- Mons., abbreviation of Monsignor, an honour within the Catholic Church
- Mons Records, a jazz record-label in Germany
- Mons (film), a 1926 British silent film
- Mons (Walloon Parliament constituency), in Belgium
- Mons Officer Cadet School, a British Army training establishment, 1947–1972
- Ministry of National Security (Grenada) (MONS), the interior ministry of the government of Grenada

== See also ==
- Mon (disambiguation)
- Mons Affair, an 18th-century episode in Russian history
- Mons Meg, a medieval bombard located at Edinburgh Castle, Scotland
