= Stepan Vasiliyevich Lopukhin =

Russian general, courtier and nobleman

Stepan Vasiliyevich Lopukhin (Russian: Степан Васильевич Лопухин; c. 1685 – 6 (17) July 1748; Selenginsk) was a Russian general, courtier and nobleman from the Lopukhin family. He became chamberlain in 1727 and a lieutenant general in 1741, as well as serving on the Admiralty Board from 1740 to 1741. He was the husband of Natalia Lopukhina and was arrested before the Lopukhina Affair.

== Sources ==
- (in Russian) Лопухины // БРЭ. — М: Большая российская энциклопедия, 2011. — Т. 18. — С. 40. — 768 с. — 60 000 экз. — ISBN 978-5-85270-351-4.
