= Natalia Lopukhina =

Russian noble (1699–1763)

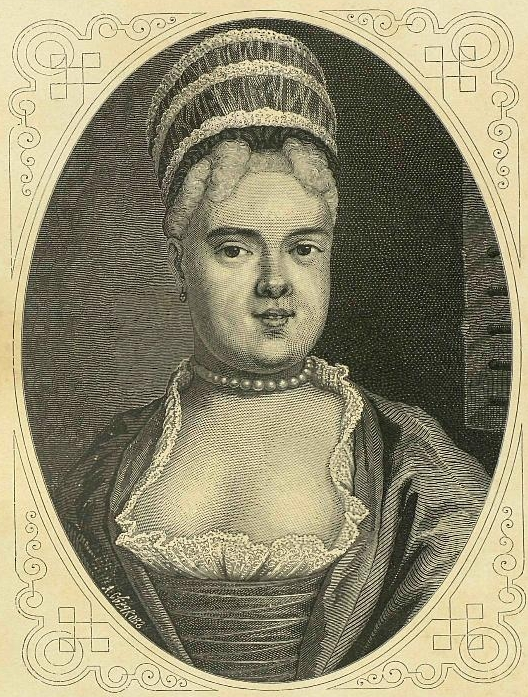
- Born: November 11, 1699
- Died: March 11, 1763 (aged 63)
- Spouse: Stepan Lopukhin
- Parent(s): Modesta Mons; Fyodor Balk

Natalia Fyodorovna Lopukhina (November 11, 1699 – March 11, 1763) was a Russian noble, court official and alleged political conspirator. She was the daughter of Matryona Balk, who was the sister of Anna Mons and Willem Mons. She is famous for the Lopukhina affair, an alleged conspiracy engineered by a Franco-Holsteinian alliance at the Russian court and centered on her.

== Life ==
By marriage to Stepan Lopukhin (a cousin of Eudoxia Lopukhina and courtier of her husband Peter the Great), Lopukhina was a member of the Lopukhin family. During the reign of Anna of Russia, she was described as "the brightest flower of St. Petersburg's court". Her liaisons with some of the most powerful courtiers and her arrogance toward Peter the Great's neglected daughter Elizaveta Petrovna must have fed the latter's jealousy. Elizaveta's accession to the throne in 1741 was a huge blow to Lopukhina. It was owing to her friendship with Anna Bestuzheva, wife of Mikhail Bestuzhev, that she managed to maintain her position at court.

=== Conspiracy ===
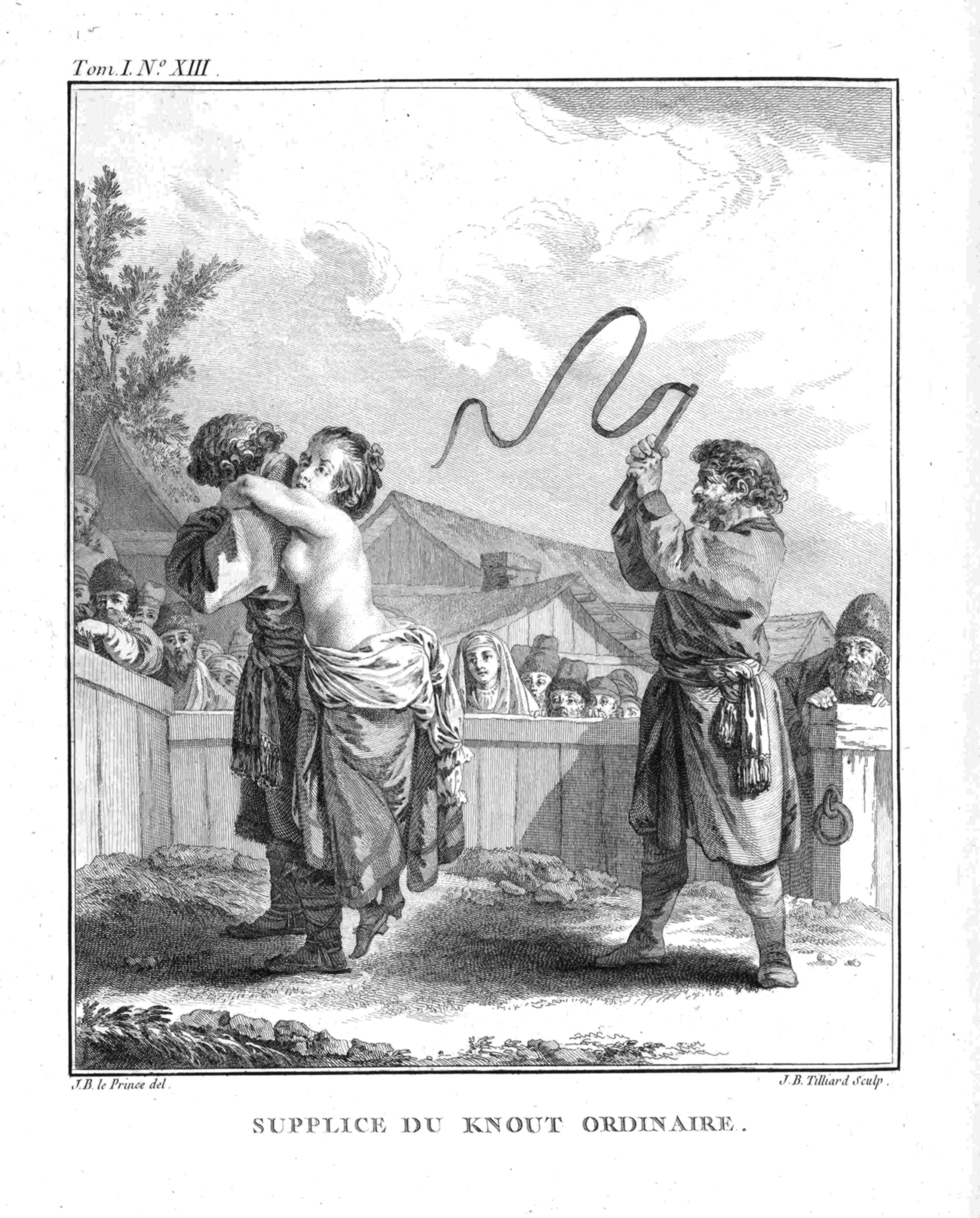
Illustration by Jean-Baptiste Le Prince of Lopukhina's flogging

In 1742, the French agents De la Chétardie and Lestocq arranged a complicated intrigue to slander both Lopukhina and Bestuzheva, thereby securing the downfall of the Austrophilic chancellor Aleksey Bestuzhev (Mikhail's brother).

Lopukhina's affection for the exiled Count von Löwenwolde being well-known, her correspondence with this odious courtier was brought to light and presented to the Empress in the most unflattering light. Simultaneously, it was reported that her son Ivan Lopukhin, being drunk in a tavern, denounced Elizaveta's taste for English beer and mumbled several phrases which were interpreted calling for restoration of Ivan VI of Russia.

The inquiry that followed established that the Lopukhin house used to be frequented by the Austrian agent Marquis Botta d'Adorno, who allegedly promised his support for the restoration of Ivan VI on the Russian throne. After a rigid inquisition of twenty-five days, the "terrible plot", as referred to by British minister Sir Cyril Wyche, was found to be "little more than the ill-considered discourses of a couple of spiteful passionate women."

Lopukhina and Bestuzheva were publicly punished on September 11, 1743. They were brought onto a scaffold in front of the Twelve Collegia in Saint Petersburg, stripped completely naked, and knouted on their bare buttocks. Bestuzheva unsuccessfully bribed the executioner to only give her a mock flogging. The two women escaped death because before her accession in 1741, Elizaveta had vowed not to sign any execution warrants as Empress, but were nevertheless flogged, had their tongues torn out, and exiled to Siberia.

The Russian ambassador to Austria was instructed to demand Botta's condign punishment. This demand was presented at a special audience; whereupon Empress Maria Theresa declared that she would never admit the validity of extorted evidence, and issued a manifesto to the Great Powers defending Botta and accusing the Russian court of rank injustice.

It is generally believed that the savage reprisal was prompted primarily by Elizaveta's personal jealousy of Lopukhina's beauty and hostility towards the Mons family, who had blocked the ascension of her mother Catherine I of Russia to the throne. Lopukhina was allowed to return to the Russian capital only after Elizaveta's death on January 5, 1762.
