= Evgeny Mons =

Russian ice hockey player

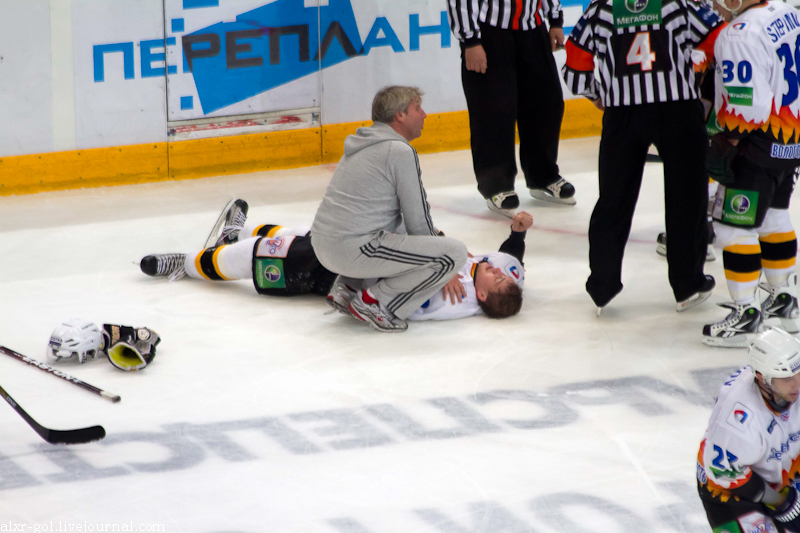
- Born: March 27, 1989 (age 35); Cherepovets, Russian SFSR
- Height: 6 ft 4 in (193 cm)
- Weight: 231 lb (105 kg; 16 st 7 lb)
- Position: Forward
- Shot: Left
- Played for: Severstal Cherepovets; Kapitan Stupino; HC Lipetsk; Almaz Cherepovets; Kristall Saratov; Izhstal Izhevsk; HC Vityaz; HC Dinamo Saint Petersburg; HK Dukla Michalovce; HC 07 Detva; Donbass Donetsk
- Playing career: 2007–2021

Evgeny Mons (born March 27, 1989) is a Russian professional ice hockey centre who currently plays for HC 07 Detva of the Slovak Extraliga (Slovak).

Mons made his top league professional debut with Severstal Cherepovets in the inaugural Kontinental Hockey League season of 2008–09.

After 13 seasons within Severstal Cherepovets, Mons left the club as a free agent prior to the 2018–19 season, and signed a two-year contract with Russian club, HC Vityaz of the KHL, on May 4, 2018.

== Career statistics ==
			Regular season					Playoffs
Season	Team	League	GP	G	A	Pts	PIM	GP	G	A	Pts	PIM
2005–06	Severstal Cherepovets-2	Russia3	34	6	12	18	10	—	—	—	—	—
2006–07	Severstal Cherepovets-2	Russia3	63	22	20	42	56	—	—	—	—	—
2007–08	Severstal Cherepovets-2	Russia3	16	4	1	5	16	—	—	—	—	—
2007–08	Kapitan Stupino	Russia2	37	4	7	11	62	—	—	—	—	—
2007–08	Kapitan Stupino-2	Russia3	1	0	0	0	0	—	—	—	—	—
2008–09	Severstal Cherepovets	KHL	5	1	0	1	2	—	—	—	—	—
2008–09	Severstal Cherepovets-2	Russia3	11	12	10	22	22	9	2	2	4	8
2008–09	HC Lipetsk	Russia2	32	13	10	23	42	1	1	1	2	25
2009–10	HC Lipetsk	Russia2	54	20	31	51	32	4	0	2	2	2
2010–11	Severstal Cherepovets	KHL	25	2	4	6	10	—	—	—	—	—
2010–11	Almaz Cherepovets	MHL	26	16	11	27	18	5	3	0	3	6
2011–12	Severstal Cherepovets	KHL	15	2	1	3	0	4	1	0	1	4
2011–12	Kristall Saratov	VHL	3	0	0	0	0	—	—	—	—	—
2012–13	Severstal Cherepovets	KHL	18	1	0	1	0	1	0	0	0	25
2013–14	Severstal Cherepovets	KHL	18	7	5	12	28	—	—	—	—	—
2013–14	Izhstal Izhevsk	VHL	6	1	2	3	10	—	—	—	—	—
2014–15	Severstal Cherepovets	KHL	45	15	12	27	10	—	—	—	—	—
2015–16	Severstal Cherepovets	KHL	27	4	6	10	37	—	—	—	—	—
2016–17	Severstal Cherepovets	KHL	46	10	8	18	22	—	—	—	—	—
2017–18	Severstal Cherepovets	KHL	30	3	0	3	17	—	—	—	—	—
2018–19	HC Vityaz Podolsk	KHL	9	1	0	1	2	—	—	—	—	—
2018–19	HC Dinamo Saint Petersburg	VHL	16	9	7	16	4	5	2	1	3	7
2019–20	HC Vityaz Podolsk	KHL	27	4	0	4	18	—	—	—	—	—
2019–20	HC Dinamo Saint Petersburg	VHL	1	0	0	0	0	—	—	—	—	—
2019–20	HK Dukla Michalovce	Slovak	3	0	0	0	0	—	—	—	—	—
2019–20	HK Detva	Slovak	11	1	7	8	2	—	—	—	—	—
2019–20	Donbass Donetsk	Ukraine	—	—	—	—	—	10	4	4	8	4
2020–21	Donbass Donetsk	Ukraine	37	20	15	35	14	9	2	5	7	2
KHL totals			265	50	36	86	146	6	1	0	1	31
