= W. E. R. Mons =

British psychiatrist (born 1897)

Walter Ernest Richard Mons (10 November 1897 – 22 October 1984) best known as W. E. R. Mons was a British psychiatrist.

Mons was born in Switzerland but moved to England after World War I. He obtained MRCS and LRCP from Middlesex Hospital in 1926. He wrote the first book on the Rorschach test in the United Kingdom, Principles and Practice of the Rorschach Personality Test (1947). He was a psychiatric consultant at German Hospital, London's Portman Clinic and managed his own private practice.

Mons was interested in parapsychology and philosophy, his conclusions appear in Beyond Mind (1983).

== Publications ==
- Principles and Practice of the Rorschach Personality Test (1947)
- Beyond Mind (1983)
