= Mons family =

Noble family

The Mons family is a noble family of German origin associated with several affairs that shocked the court of Peter I of Russia in 1704 and 1724. The family was later incorporated into the Russian nobility.

== Notable members ==
- Anna Mons (1672–1714)
- Willem Mons (1688–1724)
- Natalia Lopukhina (1699–1763)
- Matryona Balk (née Modesta Mons)
