= Anna Mons =

Mistress of Peter the Great (1672–1714)

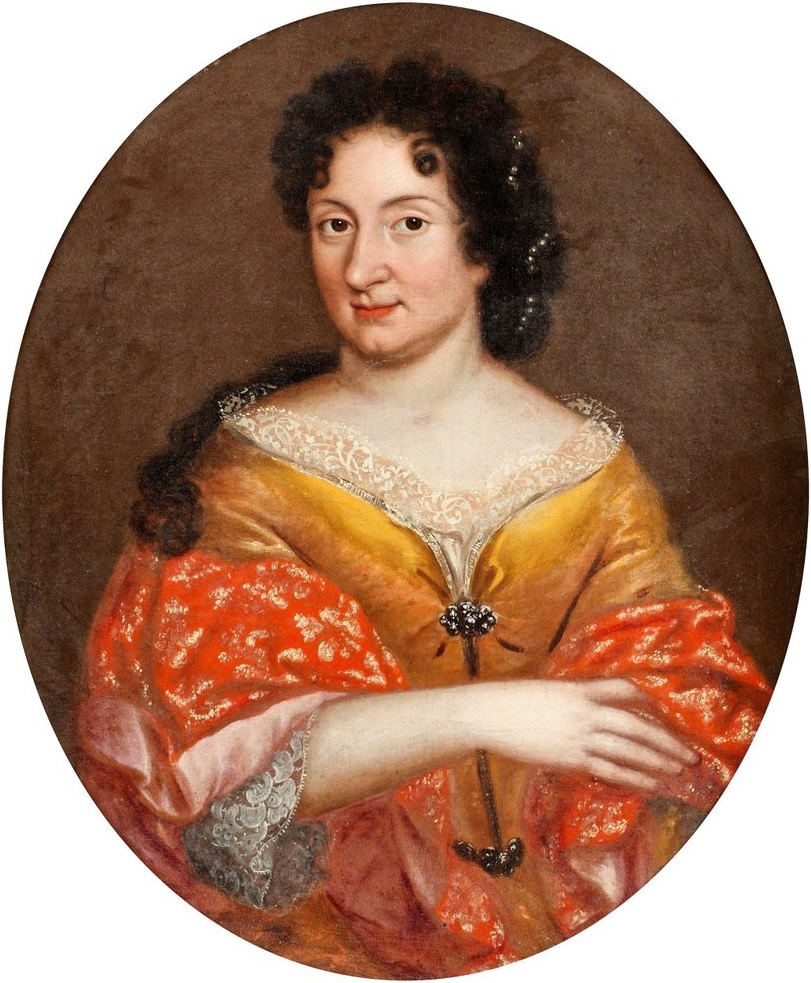
Portrait assumed to be of Mons, 1700s

Anna Mons (Russian: Анна Ивановна Монс, romanized: Anna Ivanovna Mons; 1 January 1672 – 15 August 1714) was a royal mistress of Peter the Great.

== Early life ==
Born in Moscow into the Mons family, Anna had one sister, Modesta Mons, who served as lady in waiting at the Court of Russia and one brother, Willem Mons, private secretary and alleged lover of Catherine I. Her niece was Natalia Lopukhina, famous for the Lopukhina affair.

== Royal mistress ==
In 1691, during one of his visits to the German Quarter of Moscow, young Peter I of Russia became enamoured of Anna Mons, the daughter of Westfalian wine merchant Johan Mons. Her younger brother was Willem Mons (1688–1724), destined to be the Imperial Chamberlain to Catherine I and Matrena her sister who married Fedor Balk, Major General and Governor of Riga. Her niece was the infamous Natalia Lopukhina (1699–1763) later victim of the so-called Lopukhina Affair in 1742.

As Peter's relations with the tsarina Eudoxia Lopukhina gradually worsened, Anna Mons took the place as his permanent and semi-official royal mistress. In the 1690s, he gave her 295 farms and a mansion near Moscow. The relationship lasted for 12 years.

== Later life and death ==
After Peter divorced Lopukhina, Anna had ambitions of marrying Peter herself, but by 1703 she feared he had lost interest in her and she took up a flirtation with the Prussian ambassador Keyserling in an effort to rekindle Peter's affections. Keyserling proposed marriage, provoking Peter to have Anna expelled from her estate and placed under house arrest along with her mother, sister and thirty friends.

Peter later allowed the two of them to marry, which they did in 1711. Anna died three years later of consumption.

== Aftermath ==
In 1707, Peter I married again, to Marta Helena Skowrońska, later to become Catherine I of Russia, who dyed her hair black so she would not resemble flaxen hair-ed Anna Mons. Anna's younger brother, Willem Mons, became secretary and friend of Catherine. He was an old friend of Peter's, having taken part in the Battle of Poltava.

Willem was charged and executed for abusing his access to the Empress, along with his sister Matrena, who was beaten and exiled to Tobolsk, Siberia. Matrena's husband was given permission to remarry. The siblings were accepting bribes for their influence, according to the favour asked and position of the petitioner, despite having wealth and property bestowed upon them due to their positions.

The night before the execution, Peter told Willem, although he was sorry to lose such a talented man, Willem's execution was imperative. Matrena was later restored to favour by Catherine after the death of Peter. Willem's head, preserved in alcohol, was displayed in a museum, originally the summer palace of the Tsar. It remains on display to the present day.

== Bibliography ==
- "Монс, Анна Ивановна" . Brockhaus and Efron Encyclopedic Dictionary (in Russian). 1906.
