= Matryona Balk =

Russian courtier (died 1725)

Matryona Ivanovna Balk
- Born: Modesta Mons
- Noble family: Mons family
- Spouse: Friedrich Balk
- Issue: Pavel Fedorovich Balk-Polev; Pyotr Fedorovich Balk; Natalia Lopukhina
- Father: Johann Mons
- Occupation: State lady

Matryona Ivanovna Balk (Russian: Матрёна Ивановна Балк; born Modesta Mons; died 1725) was a Russian courtier.

== Biography ==
Born into the Mons family, Modesta was the sister of Peter the Great's long-time mistress Anna Mons and Willem Mons, private secretary and alleged lover of Catherine I.

She was a lady-in-waiting and confidant of Catherine I of Russia, Ober-Hofmeisterin of Tsarevna Catherine Ivanovna of Russia and sister of Anna Mons. She was accused in 1718 for having assisted the empress in her love affair with her brother, Willem Mons.

She was the mother of Natalia Lopukhina, famous for the Lopukhina affair.

== Sources ==
- "Балк, Матрена Ивановна". Русский биографический словарь. Т. 2: Алексинский — Бестужев-Рюмин. Русский биографический словарь. 1900. pp. 448–449.
