= Willem Mons =

German-Russian courtier (1688–1724)

Willem Mons (1688 – 26 November 1724) was private secretary to Catherine I of Russia.

== Biography ==
Born in 1688 into the Mons family, Mons was the brother of Peter the Great's longtime mistress Anna Mons, lady in waiting Modesta Mons and uncle of Natalia Lopukhina.

After his sister's fall from favour, Mons joined the Russian army and took part in the Battle of Poltava. In 1711, he was appointed personal adjutant to the tsar. His other sister Matryona Balk had in the meantime become the closest friend of Catherine, whom Peter married in 1712.

In 1716, at Catherine's behest, Peter entrusted Mons to administer her estates. After Catherine's coronation as consort in 1724, Mons was promoted to the rank of imperial chamberlain. However, several few months later, he was arrested on charges of peculation (embezzlement) and breach of trust and, after a brief and brutal inquiry by Pyotr Tolstoy, he was publicly beheaded on November 27. His head was preserved in alcohol and was supposedly kept temporarily in the Kunstkamera. There is a legend that Peter forced his wife to contemplate this gruesome exhibit for hours.

The true causes of Mons's downfall are obscure. It was rumoured that Peter was enraged by his intimacy with the empress. Many courtiers regarded Mons as Catherine's lover and his sister Matryona as their matchmaker. However, the affair did not affect Catherine's position as empress.

Just months after Mons's execution, Catherine succeeded to the throne and lavished honours on Matryona (who had been publicly flogged during her brother's trial) and her Lutheran daughter, Natalia Lopukhina, who would later give her name to the Lopukhina Conspiracy (1742–43).

== Bibliography ==
- "Монс, Виллим Иванович" . Brockhaus and Efron Encyclopedic Dictionary (in Russian). 1906.

== Literature ==
- Семевский М. И. Очерки и рассказы из русской истории XVIII века. Царица Катерина Алексеевна, Анна и Виллим Монс. Спб., 1883—1884.
