= Dominique-André de Chambarlhac =

- Arms of the Family de Chambarlhac
- Born: 17 May 1754; Lorraine
- Died: 4 August 1823 (aged 69); Paris, Île-de-France
- Military career
- Allegiance: Kingdom of France; French Republic; French Empire
- Branch: Engineer
- Service years: 1773–1815
- Rank: Lieutenant-General Emeritus 1815
- Awards: Legion of Honor (1804); Commandant, Legion of Honor (1806); Baron du Chambarlhac (letters patent), 1810; Chevalier, Order of Saint Louis (1815)

Dominique-André Chambarlhac (French pronunciation: [dɔminik ɑ̃dʁe ʃɑ̃baʁlak]; 17 May 1754 – 4 August 1823) was a military engineer of the French Army during the French Revolutionary Wars and the Napoleonic Wars. Born in Arraye-sur-Seille (Lorraine), he belonged to a family of native nobility of Vivarais. (Note: Sources disagree on the commune of his birth: some say Arrage-sur-Seille, which is misspelled (Array-sur-Seille). His father André de Chambarlhac, Seigneur de La Chaux, was stationed at Maubeuge in 1753. It isn't clear if his mother, Marie Mathieu, was also present there. See (in French) Nicolas Viton de Saint Allais, Nobiliare universel de France, ou recueil général des généalogies historiques des maisons nobles de ce royaume. Paris, L'Auteur, 1818, p. 301 or (in French) Jean-Baptiste-Pierre Courcelles, Dictionnaire universel de la noblesse de France, Au Bureau général de la noblesse de France,1822, pp. 73–74.)

== Family and military service ==
Born on 17 May 1754 in Lorraine, he was the illegitimate son of André de Chambarlhac, Lieutenant colonel and Seigneur de La Chaux, and Marie-Mathieu. (Note: There is some suggestion that he was actually born in 1752, but not legitimated until 1754, upon the marriage of his parents. See (in French) M. de Saint-Allais (Nicolas Viton), Nobiliaire universel de France: Chambarlhac, France, Au bureau du Nobiliaire universel de France, Réimprimé à la Librairie Bachelin-Deflorenne, 1876, p. 302.) Chambarlhac belonged to a family of Vivarais nobility, and sources frequently confuse his family line with that of Jacques-Antoine de Chambarlhac de Laubespin, also a baron of empire. (Note: For example, Louis-Andre-Antoine Chambarlhac (d 1867) is frequently attributed to Dominique Andre Chambarlhac, but is actually in the Laubespin line. Alcide misattributes parentage; but Albert Révérend places the son with Jacques-Antoine de Chambarlhac.)

He became a cadet on 1 June 1763, in the King's Infantry Regiment. Admitted to the School of Engineering at Mezieres in 1769, he graduated on 31 January 1773 as second lieutenant and received the certificate for engineering first lieutenant on 18 January 1775. He served successively in such fortifications as Nancy, Verdun, Thionville, Landau and Fort-Louis from 1776 to 1785, and achieved the rank of captain on 30 March 1786.

He joined the Vosges volunteers and commanded the Fort-Louis on 11 August 1792. Subsequently, he was appointed lieutenant colonel and engineer-in-chief. As chief engineer, Chambarlhac was responsible for the defense during the siege. Finally, without ammunition, food, or supplies, the garrison surrendered on 14 November 1794; Chambarlhac was not released until 23 September 1795 (1 vendemaire an IV). During his captivity, and in recognition of his gallant defense, on 21 March 1795 (1 germinal an III ), he received the rank of brigade chief and director of fortifications.

After his release, he served in Strasbourg, another heavily fortified city, from 16 October 1795 (24 vendemaire an IV). On 9 March 1796 (19 Ventose an V), as chief engineer, joined the Army of the Rhine and Moselle. Throughout 1796, he served in this Army's campaign, supervising the crossing into the German states, and the offensives at several cities. He supervised the technical aspects of the defense of the fortress of Kehl at the end of the campaign, and he was wounded in the leg during one of the French sorties to dislodge the Austrian besiegers.

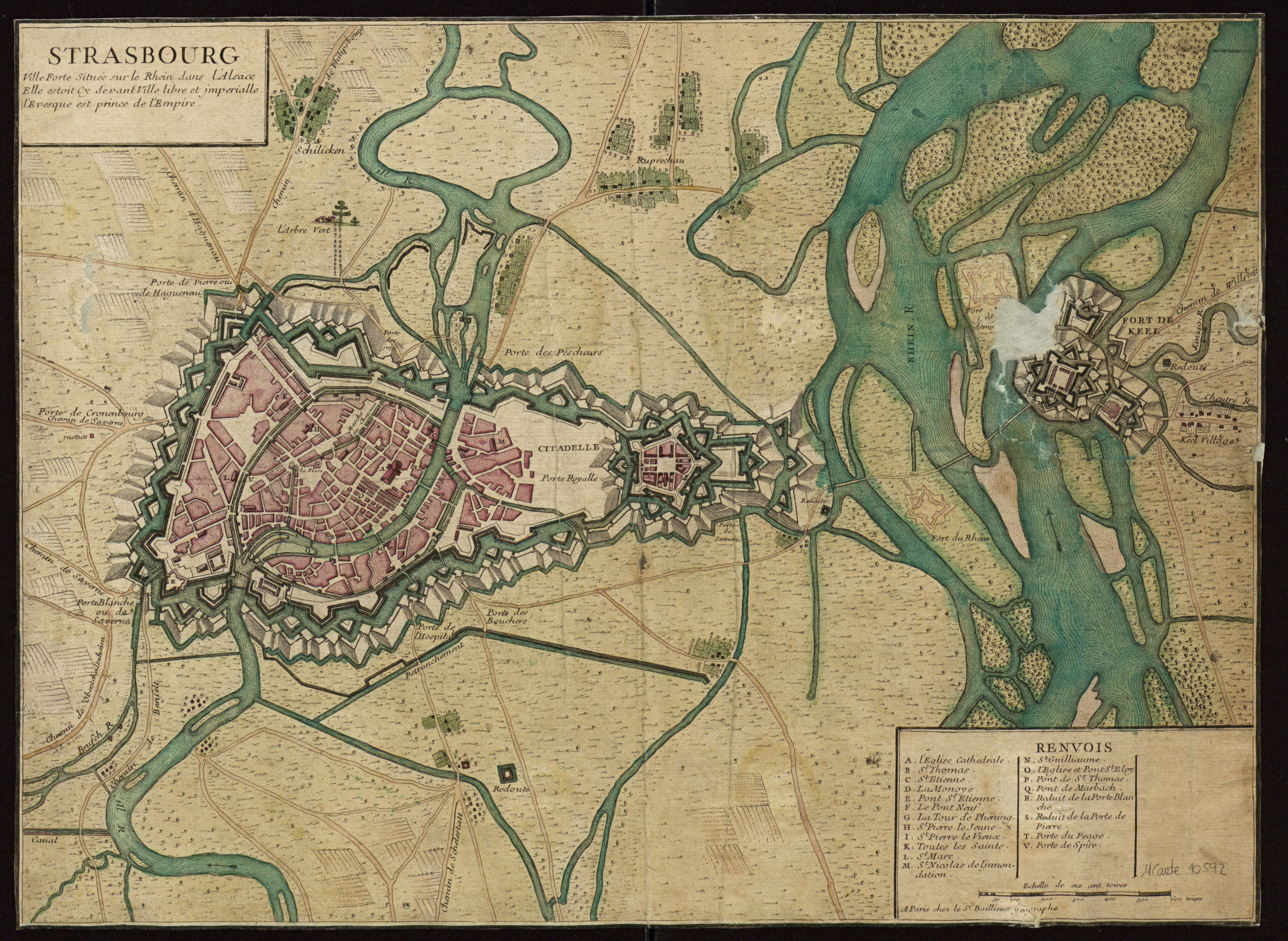
Chambarlhiac supervised the technical defense of the old Vauban fortress at Strasbourg/Kehl.

The fortress at Kehl fell on 9 January 1797, and the fortress at Hüningen a month later. On 19 February 1797 (1 ventôse an V), Chambarlhac assumed charge of the fortifications at Landau. He left 29 August 1800 to supervise the refortification of Mainz. The government charged him in 1801 with the demolition of fortifications at Kastel, Ehrenbreitstein and Düsseldorf. On 11 December 1803 (19 frimaire an XII), he received a founding patent of the Legion of Honor.

=== Napoleonic wars ===
Sent to the Army of Naples in 1806, Chambarlhac witnessed the siege of Gaeta, and received, after the surrender of the place, the order to go to the Grande Armée. On August 15 of this year, the Napoleon elevated him to commander of the Legion of Honor. He took an active part in the sieges of Magdeburg, at the end of 1806, as well as those of Colberg and Stralsund, and the defense of the citadel of Passau in 1808.

The following year, the War Minister entrusted him with the restoration of the fortifications of this place and the establishment of the bridgehead Lintz. He followed this assignment as inspection of fortresses and bridges in the Netherlands, where he was in charge in 1810, earning him (6 October 1809) the title of baron of the Empire. In 1811, he completed the fortifications of Danzig and contributed, two years later, to its defense. Imprisoned in Stettin in 1813 and 1814, Chambarlhac returned to France after Napoleon's abdication.

On 27 June 1814, Louis XVIII gave Chambarlhac the Cross of St. Louis and appointed him Lieutenant-General Emeritus on 20 August. During his Hundred Days, Napoleon confirmed Chambarlhac in that grade by decree of 18 April 1815. Chambarlhac retired on October 18 that year, and died on 4 August 1823 in Paris, Île-de-France.

=== Promotions and honors ===
Chambarlhac received the following promotions, assignments and awards:

- Cadet 1 June 1763 Royal Infantry
- Engineering school, 1769
- Lieutenant 31 January 1773
- Captain 30 March 1786
- Lieutenant colonel/engineer in chief, Vosges Volunteers 8 November 1792
- Prisoner of War after the surrender of Saint-Louis, 14 November 1793 –23 September 1795
- Chef of brigade and Director of Fortifications, 21 March 1795
- General of Brigade 1 February 1805
- Commander Legion of Honor, 15 August 1806
- Fortifications Inspector Holland 1810
- Fortifications of Stettin 1813–1814
- Lieutenant-General honorary 27 June 1814 (by Louis XVIII)
- Chevalier of the Order of Saint Louis 27 June 1814
- Retirement 18 October 1815
