= Siege of Fort-Louis (1793) =

Siege of the War of the First Coalition

Coordinates: 48°48′7″N 8°3′26″E

- Part of War of the First Coalition
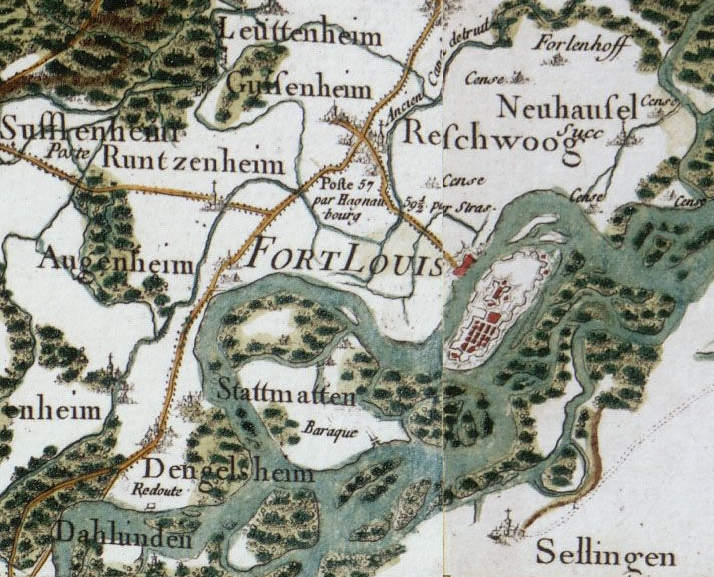
- Map of Fort-Louis by Cassini (1756–1815)
Date	14 October – 14 November 1793
Location	Fort-Louis, Bas-Rhin, France
Result	Coalition victory

Belligerents
(Habsburg monarchy) Habsburg Austria; Hesse-Darmstadt; Electorate of Bavaria	(French First Republic) Republican France

Commanders and leaders
(Habsburg monarchy) Franz von Lauer	(French First Republic) Michel Durand

Strength
4,700, 55 guns	4,500, 111 guns

Casualties and losses
unknown	4,500, 5 colors

The siege of Fort-Louis (14 October – 14 November 1793) saw a force composed of Habsburg Austrians, Hessians and Bavarians led by Franz von Lauer lay siege to Fort-Louis which was held by a Republican French garrison under Michel Durand. The French capitulated after a defense lasting exactly one month. The siege occurred during the War of the First Coalition, part of the French Revolutionary Wars. In 1793 the fortress was sited on an island in the Rhine River, but today Fort-Louis is a village in the Bas-Rhin department in France.

== Siege ==
General of Brigade Michel Durand's 4,500-strong garrison consisted of the 1st Battalions of the 4th Light, 37th Line and 40th Line Infantry Demi Brigades and the Strasbourg Volunteers, 3rd Battalions of the Gard and Saône-et-Loire Volunteers, and the 12th Battalion of the Vosges Volunteers. Dominique-André de Chambarlhac supervised the technical elements of the defense. Altogether, Fort-Louis mounted 111 artillery pieces. General-major Franz von Lauer commanded the 4,700-man besieging force which included a siege train of 55 guns. Lauer commanded three battalions of the Combined Bavarian Regiment, one battalion from the Hessian Leib Regiment, the Hessian Leib Grenadier Battalion, one Austrian battalion from an unknown regiment and two squadrons of the Szekler Hussar Regiment.
