= Franz von Lauer =

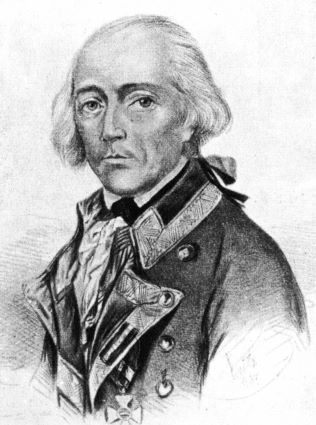
- Franz von Lauer
- Born: 11 May 1736
- Died: 11 September 1803 (aged 67); Krems an der Donau, Austria
- Military career
- Allegiance: Habsburg monarchy
- Branch: Engineers
- Service years: 1755–1801
- Rank: Feldzeugmeister
- Conflicts: Seven Years' War; Austro-Turkish War (1788–1791); Siege of Belgrade; War of the First Coalition; Siege of Fort-Louis; Siege of Mannheim; Battle of Bassano; Siege of Mantua; War of the Second Coalition; Battle of Ampfing; Battle of Hohenlinden
- Awards: Military Order of Maria Theresa, KC 1789, CC 1795

Franz von Lauer (11 May 1736 – 11 September 1803) entered the Imperial Army as a military engineer in 1755 and ended his career as Feldzeugmeister. After serving in the Seven Years' War, by 1783 he had reached the rank of oberst, or colonel. He fought against Ottoman Turkey at Belgrade and became a general officer for his distinguished effort as a siege specialist.

During the War of the First Coalition against the French First Republic, he directed the sieges of Fort-Louis in 1793 and Mannheim in 1795. In 1796, he was named chief of staff of the army sent to oppose Napoleon Bonaparte in Italy, fighting at Bassano and Mantua. In 1800, he was appointed deputy commander of the main army in southern Germany, which ended in disastrous defeat at Hohenlinden in December. He was made the scapegoat for this failure and dismissed from the service shortly thereafter.

== Pre-French Revolutionary Wars career ==
Born in 1736, Lauer studied at the Imperial and Royal Technical Military Academy and joined the Imperial Army in 1755. After being promoted to captain during the Seven Years' War, he continued his military studies and became an expert in siege warfare and fortifications. While supervising the construction of fortifications, he received promotion to major in 1773, Oberstleutnant in 1779, and Oberst in 1783. During the Austro-Turkish War (1787-1791) he earned appointment to the rank of General-Feldwachtmeister and the Knight's Cross of the Military Order of Maria Theresa for his distinguished actions at the Siege of Belgrade in 1789. He was appointed the noble rank of Freiherr in 1790.

== War of the First Coalition ==
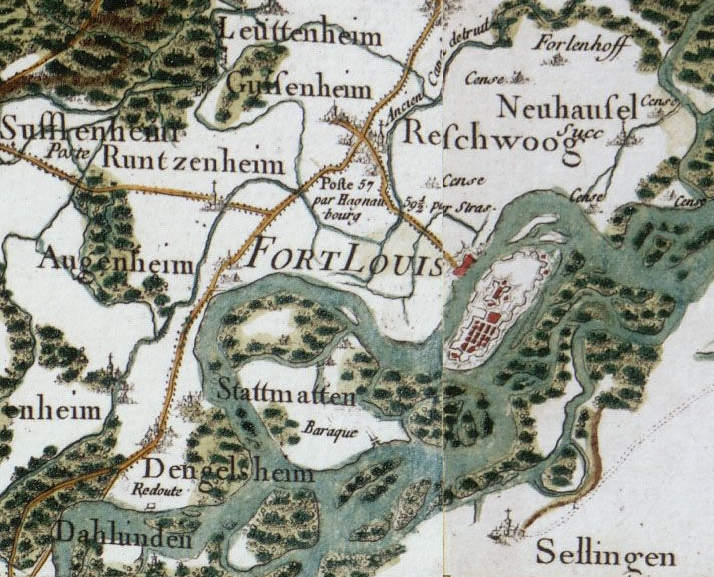
Map of Fort-Louis

Lauer fought on the upper Rhine River under the command of Dagobert Sigmund von Wurmser in 1793–1794. On 13 October 1793, Wurmser defeated the French in the First Battle of Wissembourg and the next day Lauer employed his expertise to besiege Fort-Louis. A strong position situated on an island in the Rhine River and held by a garrison of 4,500, on 14 November he accepted its surrender. Still with Wurmser, he fought at the successful Siege of Mannheim in late 1795. For notable actions in capturing the Neckerauer redoubt on 30 October, he earned the Commander's Cross of the Military Order of Maria Theresa. Promotion to Feldmarschall-Leutnant followed on 4 March 1796.

When the Siege of Mantua was briefly raised in early August 1796, Lauer supervised repairs to its fortifications. On 19 August, Emperor Francis II ordered Wurmser to make another attempt to relieve the town and named Lauer as his chief-of-staff. When drawing up the plan of attack, Lauer assumed that losses would prevent the French from quickly reacting to an Austrian offensive. This belief proved mistaken when Bonaparte hurled three divisions north into the upper Adige River valley. After overwhelming Paul Davidovich's covering force at the Battle of Rovereto, the French commander sent his troops marching east, then south down the Brenta River valley. Bonaparte crushed Wurmser at the Battle of Bassano on 8 September, then followed him as he marched toward Mantua. Ultimately, Wurmser became trapped in Mantua along with nearly 30,000 soldiers. "To his credit, Lauer thereafter proved the key man during the very stubborn defense of Mantua." The fortress finally surrendered on 2 February 1797.

After the War of the First Coalition Lauer became the director-general of engineers, a post that he held from April 1797 to February 1801.

== War of the Second Coalition ==
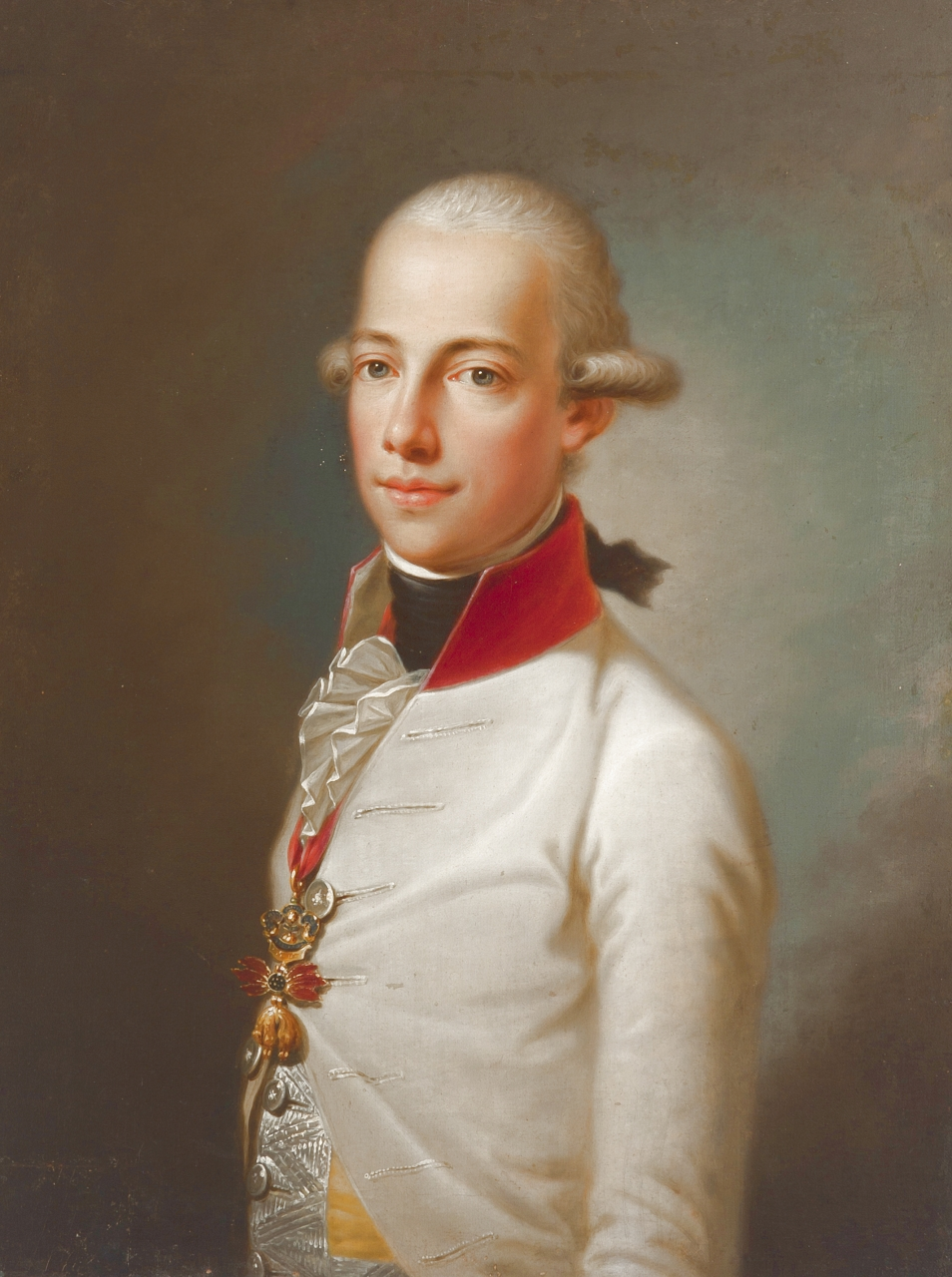
Archduke John

When the War of the Second Coalition began in 1799, Archduke Charles, Duke of Teschen asked that Lauer be returned to field service. During the campaign of spring 1800 in Southern Germany, a well-organized and equipped French army of 108,000 under Jean Victor Marie Moreau faced an Imperial force of 120,000 commanded by Pál Kray. Although slightly larger, Kray's army included troops of lower quality and the Austrians were driven from the Rhine to the Inn River. The two sides agreed an armistice on 15 July and Emperor Francis decided to replace Kray.

While the truce remained in force, the Austrians engaged in futile peace negotiations while preparing to renew the war. Francis wanted Archduke Charles to lead the army, but Charles declined because he doubted the Austrian army was strong enough to contend with France. Instead, Francis selected Charles' inexperienced 18-year-old brother, Archduke John of Austria as commander, and made Lauer his second-in-command, calling him "the most innovative man in the art of war". Francis chose John hoping that his status would end the tendency of senior officers to discuss orders and obey them only if they agreed. At the same time, he expected John to remain a mere figurehead while Lauer made the important decisions, creating a very awkward command structure.

Lauer was promoted Feldzeugmeister on 5 September 1800. With the armistice due to end soon after the beginning of September, both armies began moving into their assembly areas. The Austrian leaders remained divided whether to continue the war or sue for peace. At this point, Bonaparte, now First Consul, proposed a renewal of the truce for 45 days in exchange for Austria evacuating three fortresses in Bavaria. Lauer advised Francis to agree since it freed the 20,000 troops needed to garrison them. The new truce was signed on 20 September; in the event one party decided not to continue, they were required to give the other 15 days notice. Bonaparte decided peace talks were not yielding the results he wanted and on 12 November notified the Austrians the armistice would end in 15 days.

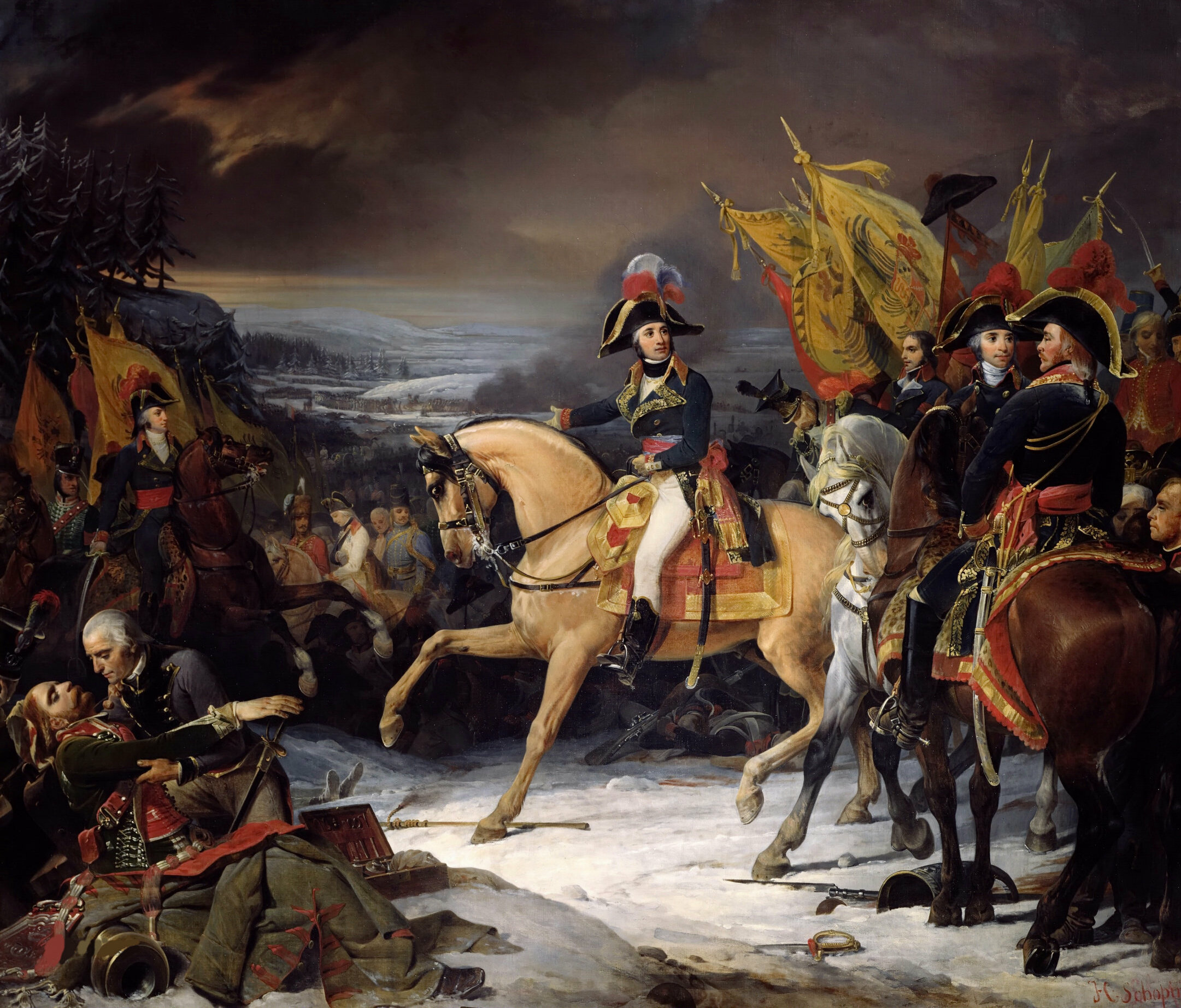
The Battle of Hohenlinden by Henri Frédéric Schopin, 1836. Lauer became the scapegoat for the defeat at Hohenlinden.

In the Austrian army, the line regiments had been brought up to their authorized strengths and additional light infantry units were raised. The main field army counted 49,000 infantry and 16,500 cavalry while additional forces guarded the flanks. Franz von Weyrother, Archduke John's chief-of-staff, persuaded John and Lauer to adopt an offensive strategy to turn the French left flank. Weyrother's strategy was good on paper, but it did not take into account the limitations of the Habsburg army. The heavy rains combined with hard marching caused desertions, serious straggling, and tired out the troops before the coming battle. Meanwhile, the army's artillery and wagon trains fell behind. Lauer convinced John to abandon Weyrother's flanking strategy and advance directly on Munich. Despite the difficulties, the Austrians approached Hohenlinden with a slight numerical advantage, even though the French outnumbered them in south Germany.

The Austrians scored a costly victory over the French at the Battle of Ampfing on 1 December 1800. Lauer pointed out that in the heavily wooded country, the Austrian cavalry and artillery would be ineffective. His concerns were brushed aside by Weyrother and his clique. The success at Ampfing made John and his staff reckless in their zeal to get to grips with Moreau. Lauer remained cautious but found himself unable to impose his views on the army headquarters. On 3 December, the Austrians split into four separate columns, none of which were able to support each other, and advanced through rough terrain to open the Battle of Hohenlinden. Moreau's army ambushed the Austrians and enveloped their principal column, inflicting a decisive defeat. After a vigorous French pursuit, Imperial morale collapsed, with the French taking 20,000 prisoners. On 17 December, Archduke John was removed from command and replaced by his brother Charles. On 24 December, Emperor Francis authorized Charles to request an armistice and Moreau accepted it the next day. Bonaparte forced Austria to swallow harsh terms at the Treaty of Lunéville in February 1801.

Blamed for the disaster, Lauer retired from the army in 1801. He died in Krems an der Donau on 11 September 1803. He married Maria d'Allio. His son Joseph von Lauer (1769–1848) was promoted to major in 1800 and retired from the Austrian army in 1847 with the rank of Feldzeugmeister.
