= Ablon-sur-Seine =

- Commune
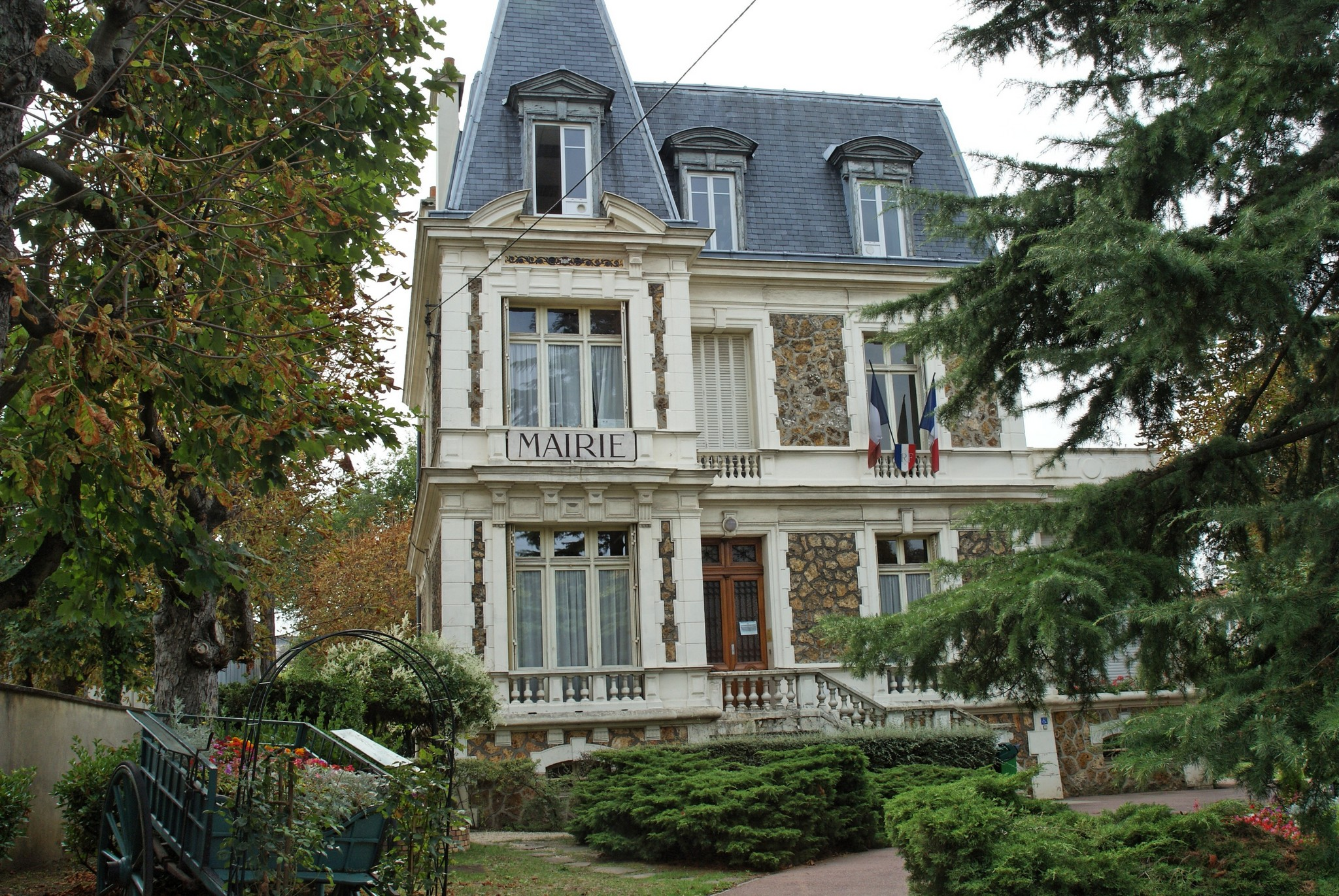
- Town hall

- Coat of arms

- Location (in red) within Paris inner suburbs
- Location of Ablon-sur-Seine
- Location within France Location within Île-de-France (region)
- Coordinates: 48°43′32″N 2°25′16″E
- Country: France
- Region: Île-de-France
- Department: Val-de-Marne
- Arrondissement: l'Haÿ-les-Roses
- Canton: Orly
- Intercommunality: Grand Paris

Government
  - Mayor (2026–32): Éric Grillon
- Area^{1}: 1.11 km^{2} (0.43 sq mi)
- Highest elevation: 85 m (279 ft)
- Lowest elevation: 32 m (105 ft)
- Population (2023): 5,988
  - Density: 5,390/km^{2} (14,000/sq mi)
- Demonym(s): Ablonais, Ablonaises
- Time zone: UTC+01:00 (CET)
  - Summer (DST): UTC+02:00 (CEST)
- INSEE/Postal code: 94001 /94480
- ^{1} French Land Register data, which excludes lakes, ponds, glaciers > 1 km^{2} (0.386 sq mi or 247 acres) and river estuaries.

Ablon-sur-Seine (French pronunciation: [ablɔ̃ syʁ sɛn], literally Ablon on Seine) is a small urban commune in the Val-de-Marne department of the Île-de-France region, located in the southeastern suburbs of Paris, France. It is located 15.3 km (9.5 mi) from the centre of Paris.

Ablon has been awarded one flower in the Concours des villes et villages fleuris ("towns and villages in bloom competition").

== Geography ==
Ablon-sur-Seine is an urban commune located some 15 kilometres (9 miles) to the south-east of the centre of Paris immediately to the east of Orly Airport.

As it is an urban commune there are numerous roads in the commune with the most important being the D266 going north to the Centre de Finances Publiques and the D29 / D246 / D2498 which run west to east along the south of the commune parallel with the Seine.

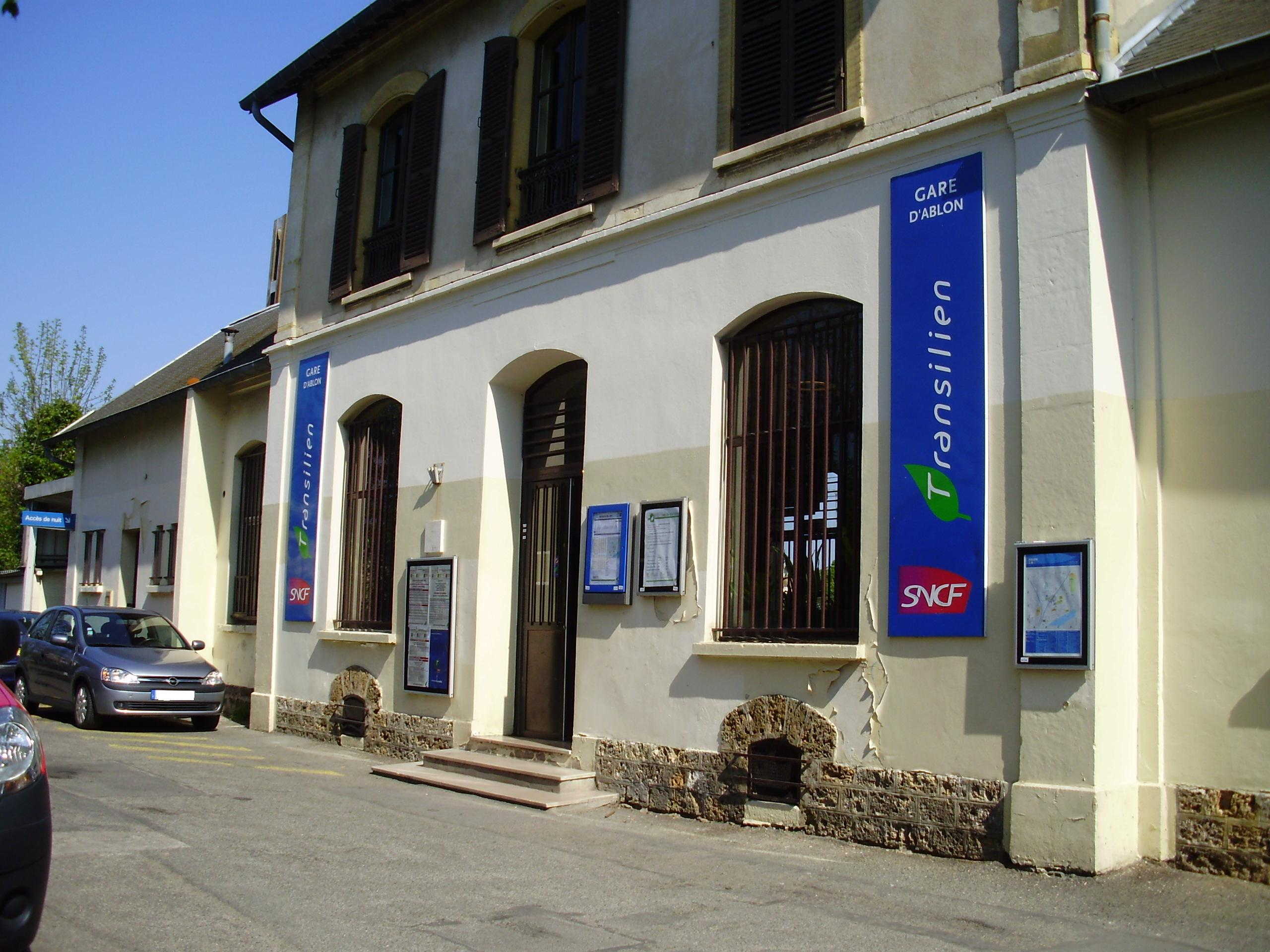
Ablon railway station

The main railway from the Gare d'Austerlitz to Bordeaux runs south-west through the commune, and Ablon station is served by regional express trains on (RER) Line C.

The Seine river forms the whole southern border of the commune. The whole of the western border and the Seine are also the border between the Val-de-Marne and Essonne departments. There is no bridge from the commune across the Seine.

== History ==
Ablon-sur-Seine is situated 4 leagues from Paris, that is 10 km (6 mi).

Human presence in the area dates back to Gallo-Roman times, with archaeological findings marking early settlement.

By the 11th and 12th centuries, the village was part of the royal domain, developed around its local church under the influence of the Abbey of Saint-Victor, and was split between two local seigneuries (Mons and the châtel of Ablon).

The earliest recorded forms of the name - Abluvium, Ablonium, Ablunum, Ablum - appear in Latin texts from the 13th century. The name Ablon likely derives from the Latin for alluvium. This refers to land formed by sediment deposits from a river’s current.

Henri IV, by the Edict of Nantes in March 1598, allowed Protestants to practice their faith outside the walls of Paris. He authorized the construction of a Protestant church at Ablons.

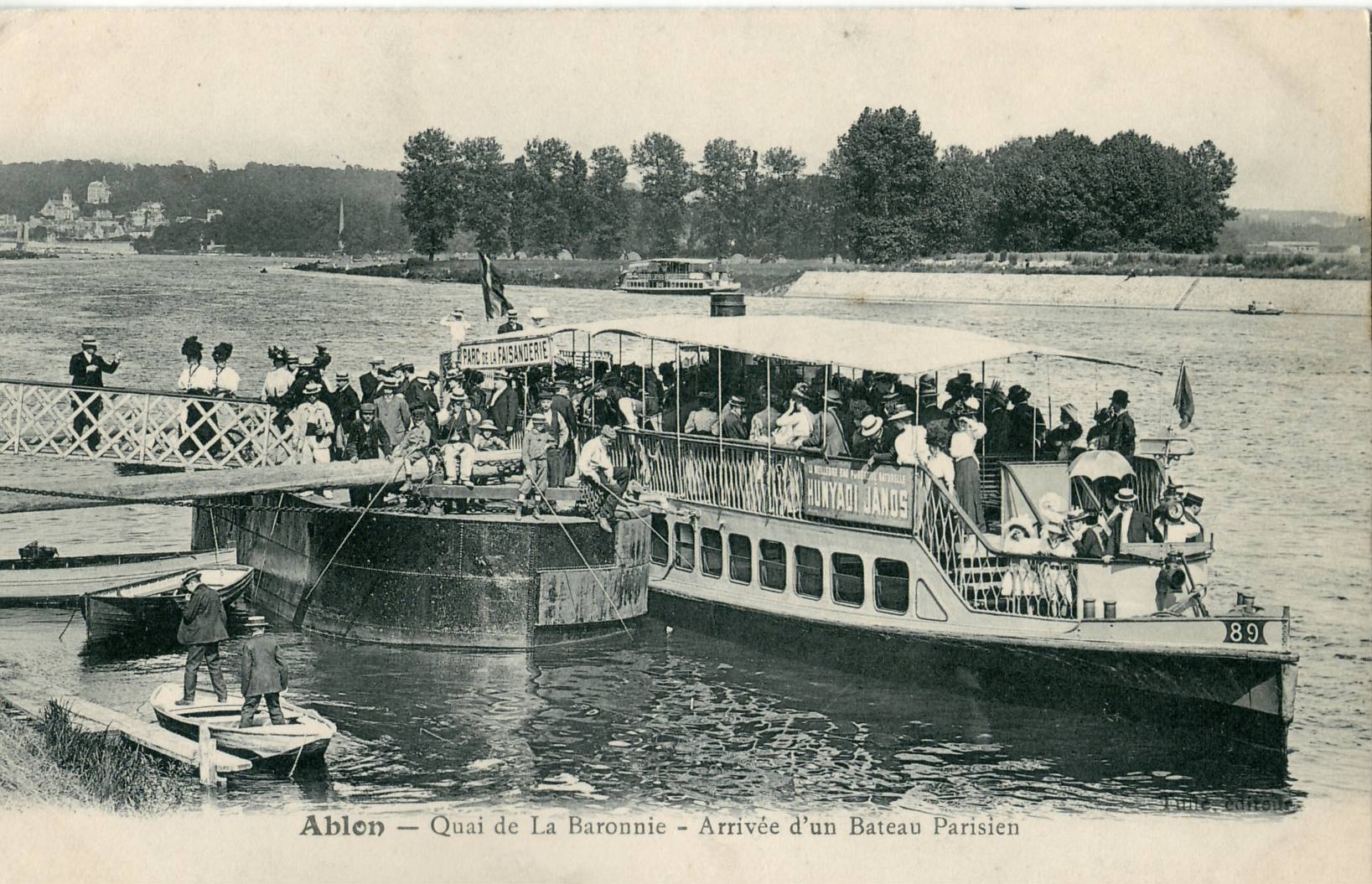
The town was served by a water taxi service to Paris at the beginning of the 20th century

There was a castle built in Ablon by Agnes Sorel and a Protestant church which was frequented until the revocation of the Edict of Nantes by the Reformed Parisians.

The economic activity Ablon has always been linked to the river but a cropping part of its economy was favoured by its loamy soils. It has been traditionally a residential commune, with the urban area mainly residential.

=== Heraldry ===
Arms of Ablon-sur-Seine	Blazon: Azure, a fesse wavy of argent charged with 3 bleak fish sable in bend accompanied in chief by an escarbuncle in Or and in base a vine-branch leaved one, fructed one, leaved one all the same.

== Administration ==
List of Successive Mayors of Ablon-sur-Seine

Mayors from the French Revolution to 1941

From	To	Name	Party	Position
1790	1792	Jean Mathias		
1800	1803	Marc Adrien Petit		
1803	1817	Jean Mathias		
1817	1826	Jacques Antoine de Chambarlhac		
1826		François Basile Pochard		
1826	1833	Jean Louis Alexis Legrand		
1833	1837	Pierre Denis Geuffron		
1837	1840	François Denis Mathias		
1840	1852	Toussaint Chollet		
1852	1855	Philippe Simon		
1855	1865	Hippolyte Lechoppie		
1865	1878	Joseph Claude Simon		
1878	1881	Adolphe Moisset		
1881	1904	Amédée Antoine Simon		
1904	1907	Adrien Constant Marc		
1907	1908	Henry Magnier		
1908	1919	Alphonse Louis Maurice Herold		
1919	1925	André Clément Hippolyte Mottu		
1925	1929	Henri Magnier		
1929	1941	Edouard Désiré Juvigny		

Mayors from 1941

From	To	Name	Party	Position
1941	1944	Arsène Victor Arsicault		
1944	1945	Edouard Désiré Juvigny		
1945	1983	Alain Poher	MRP	Senator, President of the Senate (1968-1992), Interim President of France (1969 & 1974), President of Association of Mayors of France, President of the EU
1983	2008	Jean-Pierre Hermelin	UMP	
2008	2012	Dean-Louis Cohen	PS	
2012	2014	Corinne Gorlier	DVG	
2014	2032	Éric Grillon	DVD	

=== Twinning ===
Ablon-sur-Seine has twinning associations with:

- Penkridge (United Kingdom) since 1986
- Neubiberg (Germany) since 1975.

== Population ==
The inhabitants of the commune are known as Ablonais or Ablonaises in French.

Historical population

Year	Pop.	±% p.a.
1793	208	—
1821	172	−0.68%
1846	338	+2.74%
1872	490	+1.44%
1881	600	+2.28%
1891	782	+2.68%
1896	896	+2.76%
1901	1,332	+8.25%
1906	1,420	+1.29%
1911	1,463	+0.60%
1921	1,898	+2.64%
1926	2,000	+1.05%
1931	2,246	+2.35%

Year	Pop.	±% p.a.
1936	2,193	−0.48%
1946	2,637	+1.86%
1954	3,220	+2.53%
1962	5,086	+5.88%
1968	5,692	+1.89%
1975	5,531	−0.41%
1982	5,264	−0.70%
1990	4,938	−0.80%
1999	4,867	−0.16%
2007	5,155	+0.72%
2012	5,327	+0.66%
2017	5,785	+1.66%
2023	5,988	+0.58%

Source: EHESS (1793-1999) and INSEE

== Culture and heritage ==
=== Civil heritage ===
The commune has many buildings and structures that are registered as historical monuments:

- A House at 16 Rue du Bac (19th century)
- A House at 16ter Rue du Bac (19th century)
- A House at 33bis Rue du Bac (19th century)
- The Station Cafe-Restaurant at 37 Rue du Bac (19th century)
- A Building at 42 Rue du Bac (19th century)
- The Boulangerie Pelloile at 35 Quai de la Baronne (19th century)
- A Building at 3 Place Chollet (1896)
- The Château Corpet at Sentier de la Courre aux Lièvres (1884)
- A House at 15 Rue Edouard Juvigny (19th century)
- A Château at 5 Rue de l'Eglise (1348)
- The Château Magne at Rue d'Estienne d'Orves (1856)
- A Railway Station at Rue Gabriel Péri (20th century)
- The War Memorial at Rue du Général de Gaulle (1922)
- A Cafe-Restaurant at 10 Rue du Général de Gaulle (19th century)
- A House at 15 Place Henri Duru (1893)
- A Railway Station at Place de la Libération (19th century)
- A Weir with Lock at Quai Magné (1863)
- The Town Hall / Groupe Scolaire Pasteur School at 17 Rue du Maréchal Foch (1883)
- Twinned Houses at 25-27 Rue Simon (19th century)
- The Pont du Diable (Devil's Bridge) at Route de Villeneuve (20th century)
- Houses and Buildings (19th-20th centuries)
- A House (20th century)
- Ancient Town Remains (12th-20th centuries)

=== Religious heritage ===
- The Parish Church of Our Lady of the Assumption (1842) is registered as an historical monument. The Church contains many items that are registered as historical objects:
- A Painting: Christ before the Sanhedrin (16th century)
- A Tombstone for Philippe de Douzonville (1458)
- A Ciborium (19th century)
- A Sunburst Monstrance (19th century)
- A Chalice with Paten (20th century)
- A Chalice with Paten (1) (19th century)
- A Painting: Descent from the Cross (19th century)
- A Painting: Saint Geneviève (18th century)
- A Painting: Jesus before the Sanhedrin (17th century)
- A Baptismal font (18th century)
- A Tombstone (15th century)

== Education ==
Public schools:

- Preschools: Ecole maternelle Marie Curie and Ecole maternelle Saint-Exupéry
- Elementary schools: Ecoles élémentaire Louis Pasteur A and Ecoles élémentaire Louis Pasteur B

Students in this commune are served by Collège Jean Macé (junior high school) and Collège / Lycée Georges Brassens (junior and senior high school), both in Villeneuve-le-Roi.

There is one private school called Sacré-Cœur (Sacred Heart), which serves preschool through junior high school.

== Cultural events and festivals ==
From 2001 to 2008, Ablon has organised various cultural events. An independent association, It was once Ablon, organised these events to enable people to experience the history of the town and its inhabitants arouse a community spirit in Ablon people. Some events have left their mark on the town including the grand historical rally with themes such as "Discovering neighbourhoods", "the old trades of Ablon", "a Castle Mystery", etc..

Other cultural activities include the festival "Your Neighbours Have Talent", which hosted painters, sculptors, photographers, and musicians from the region. This festival also hosted young artists from the National Conservatory of Paris, artists, and recent graduates from fine art schools.

Another event was cyber-Ablon, organized over an entireweekend. This event included activities for learning computer skills such as Internet browsing, email, Word, Excel, as well as network gaming activities for children.

For 8 March, the association proposed an event to mark the International Day of Women's Rights (films, exhibition of paintings and photographs, conferences etc.). The municipal council took this activity under consideration.

Dormant since 2008, the life of the association has been suspended.

== Picture Gallery ==
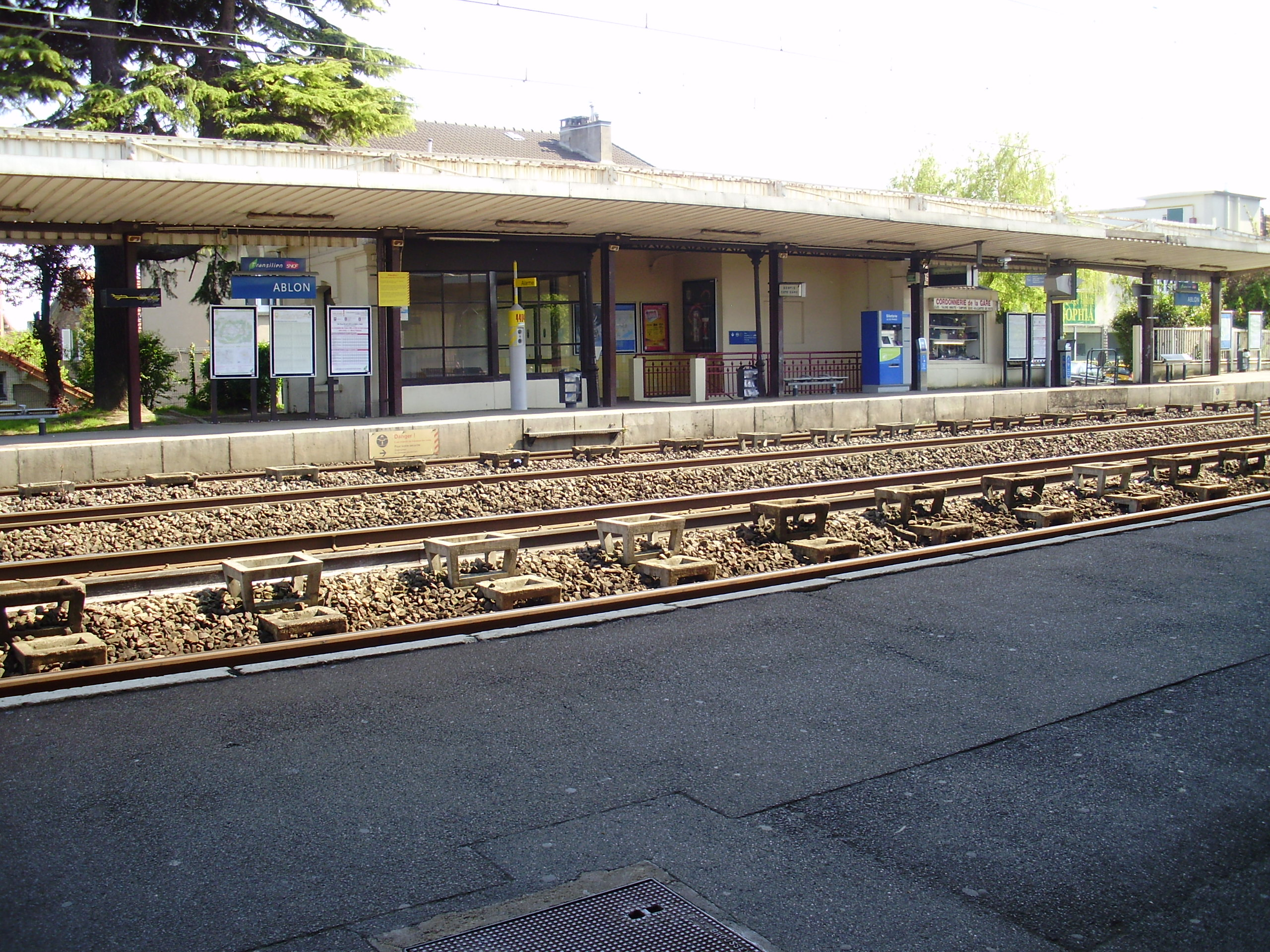
Ablon Railway Station

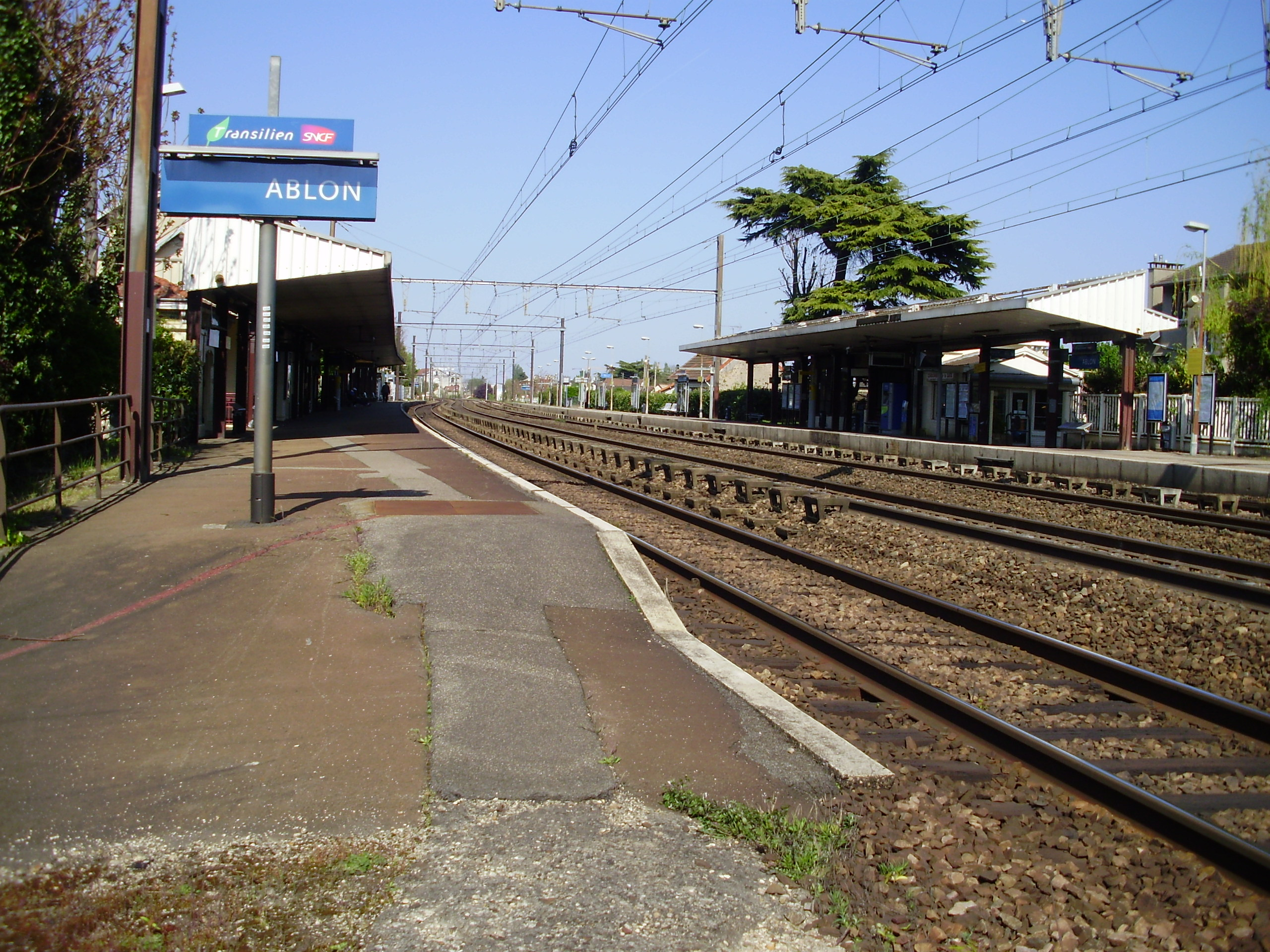
Ablon Station platforms

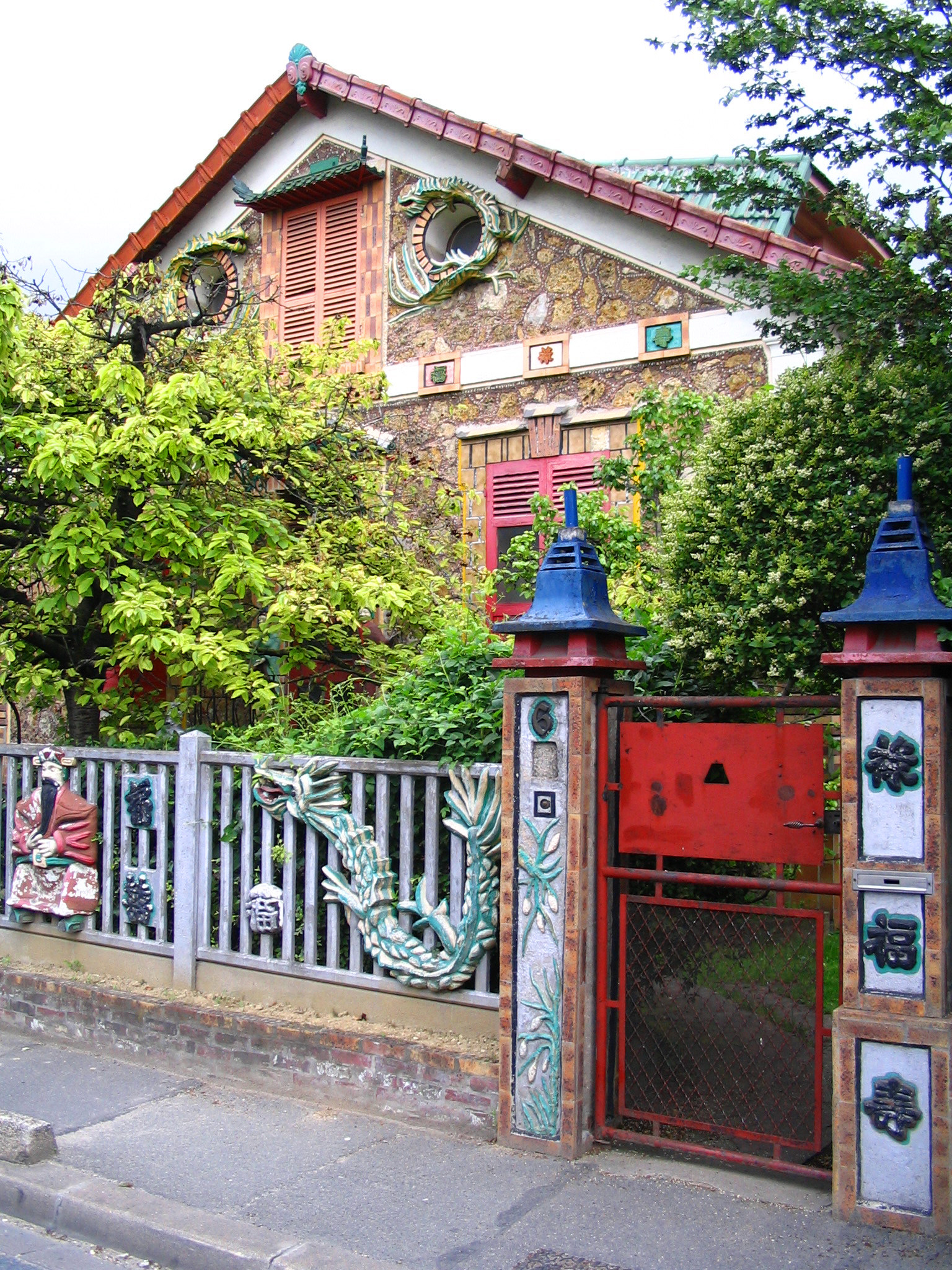
Chinese House

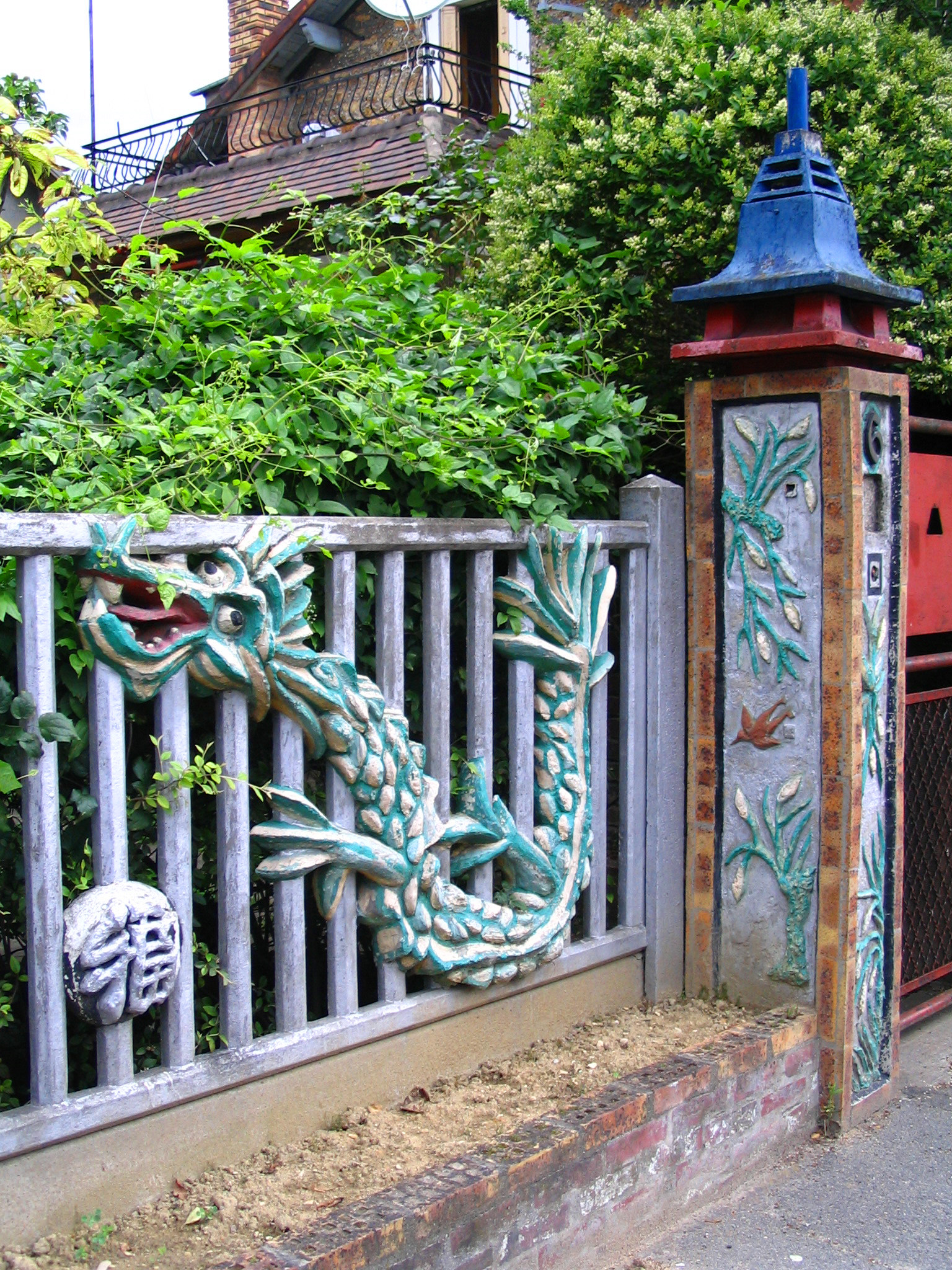
Chinese House

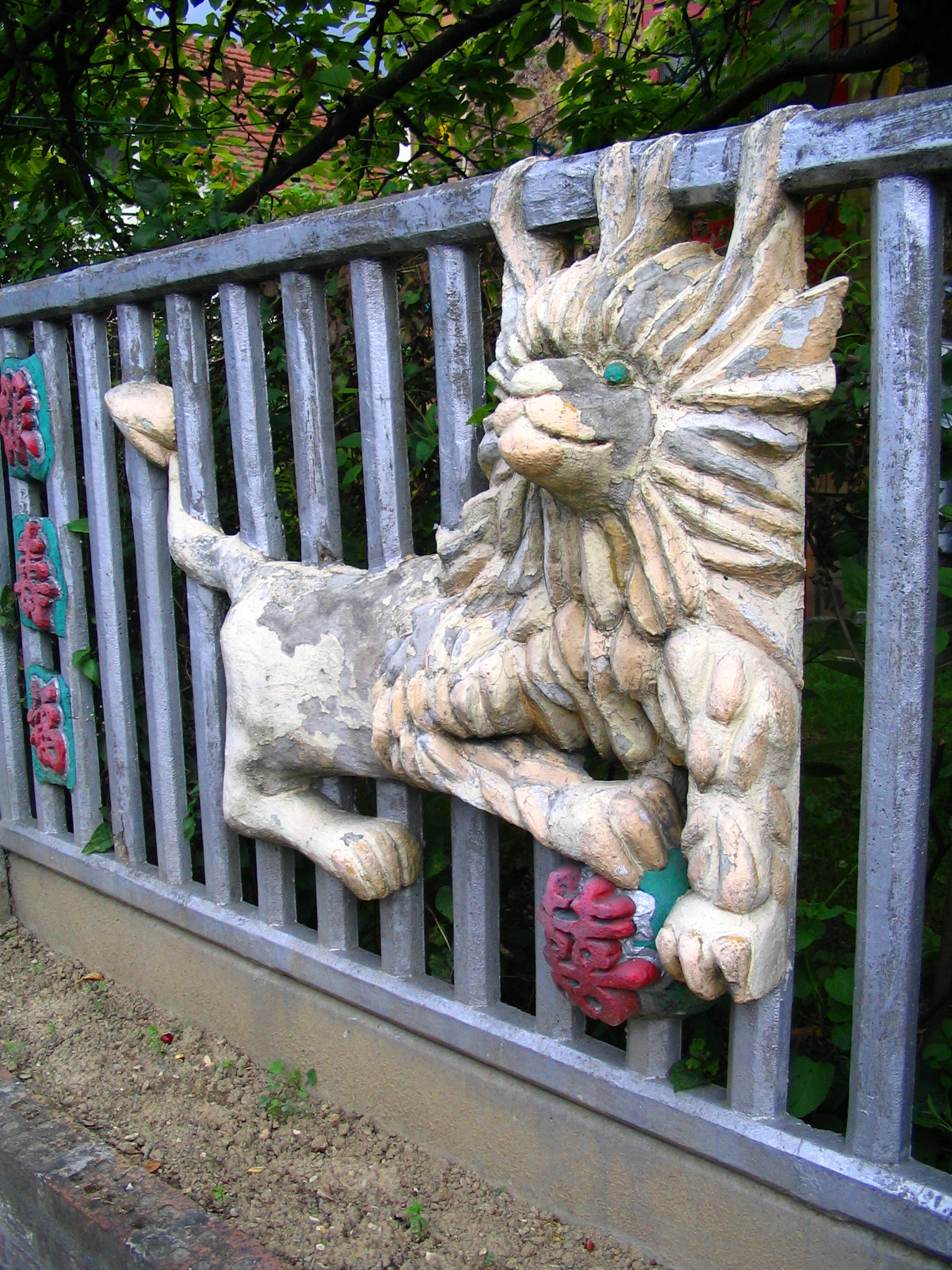
Chinese House

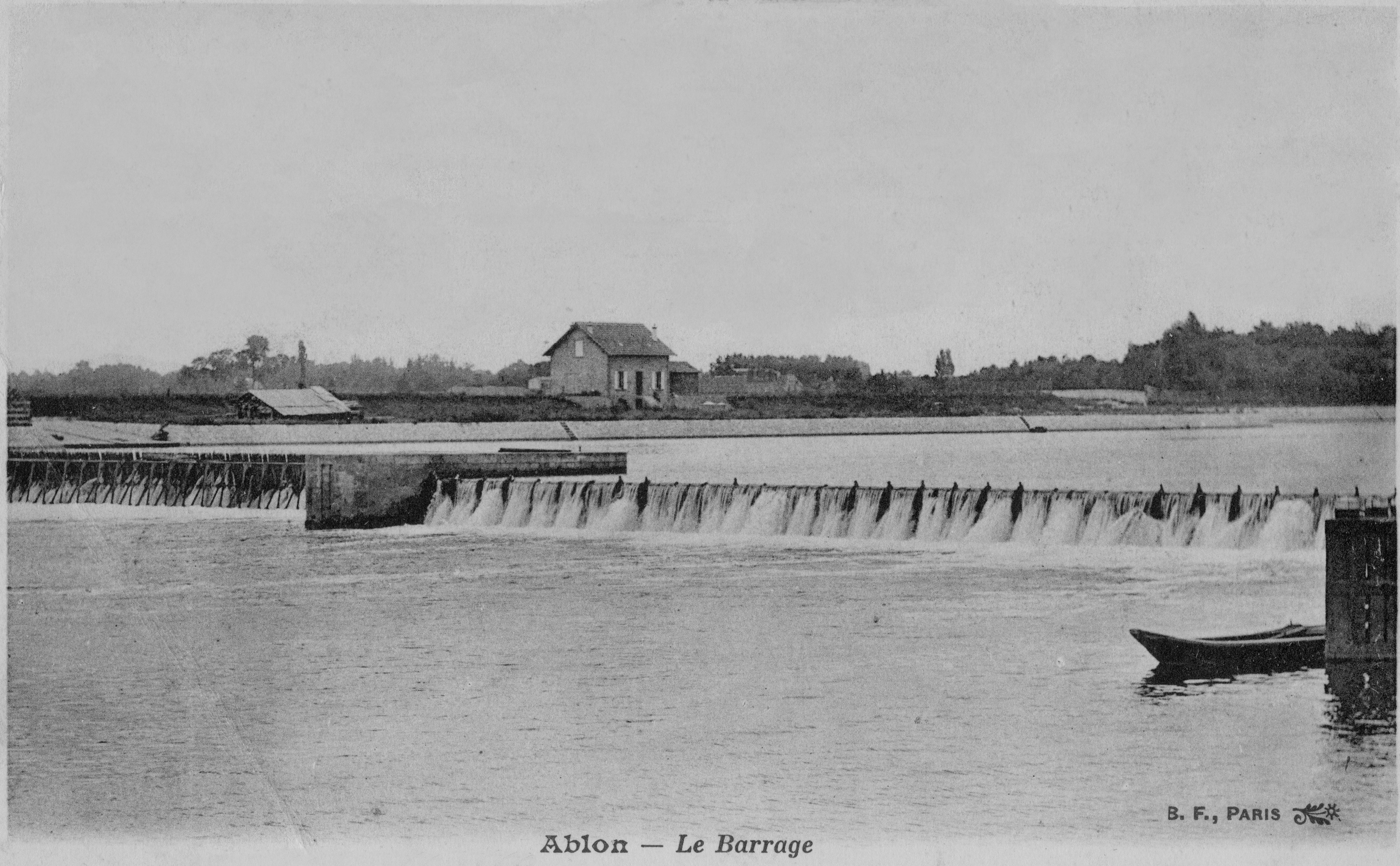
The weir at Ablon-sur-Seine

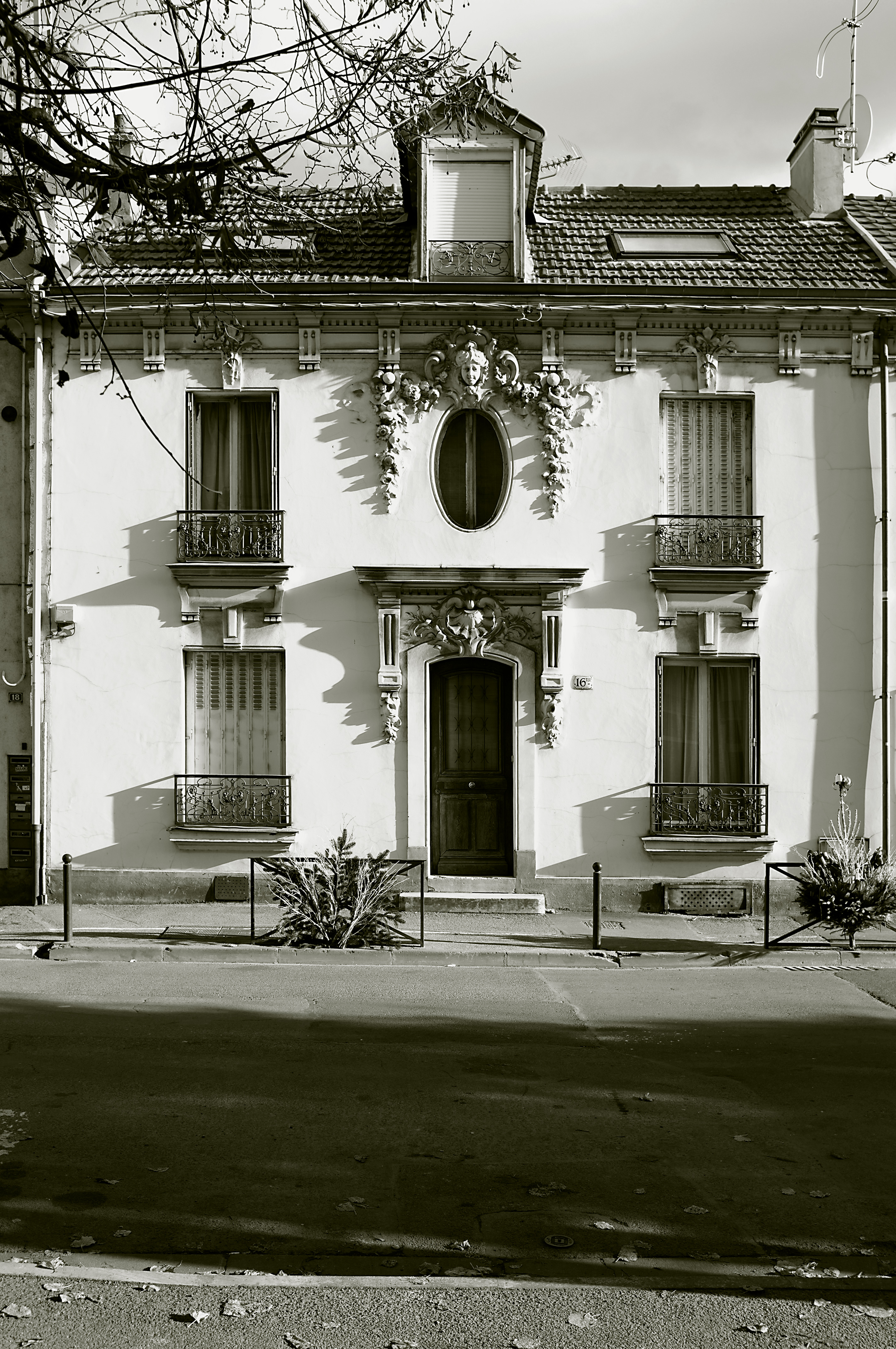
The House at 16ter Rue de Bac

== Notable people linked to the commune ==
- Jacques-Antoine de Chambarlhac de Laubespin, born at Les Estables 2 August 1754, died in Paris 23 February 1826, a General of the Empire
- Claudine Guérin de Tencin (1682-1749) owned a house in Ablon where she loved to come on holiday
- Alain Poher (1909-1996), former president of the Senate, born in Ablon he was Mayor from 1946 to 1983

== See also ==
- Communes of the Val-de-Marne department
