= Jacques-Antoine de Chambarlhac de Laubespin =

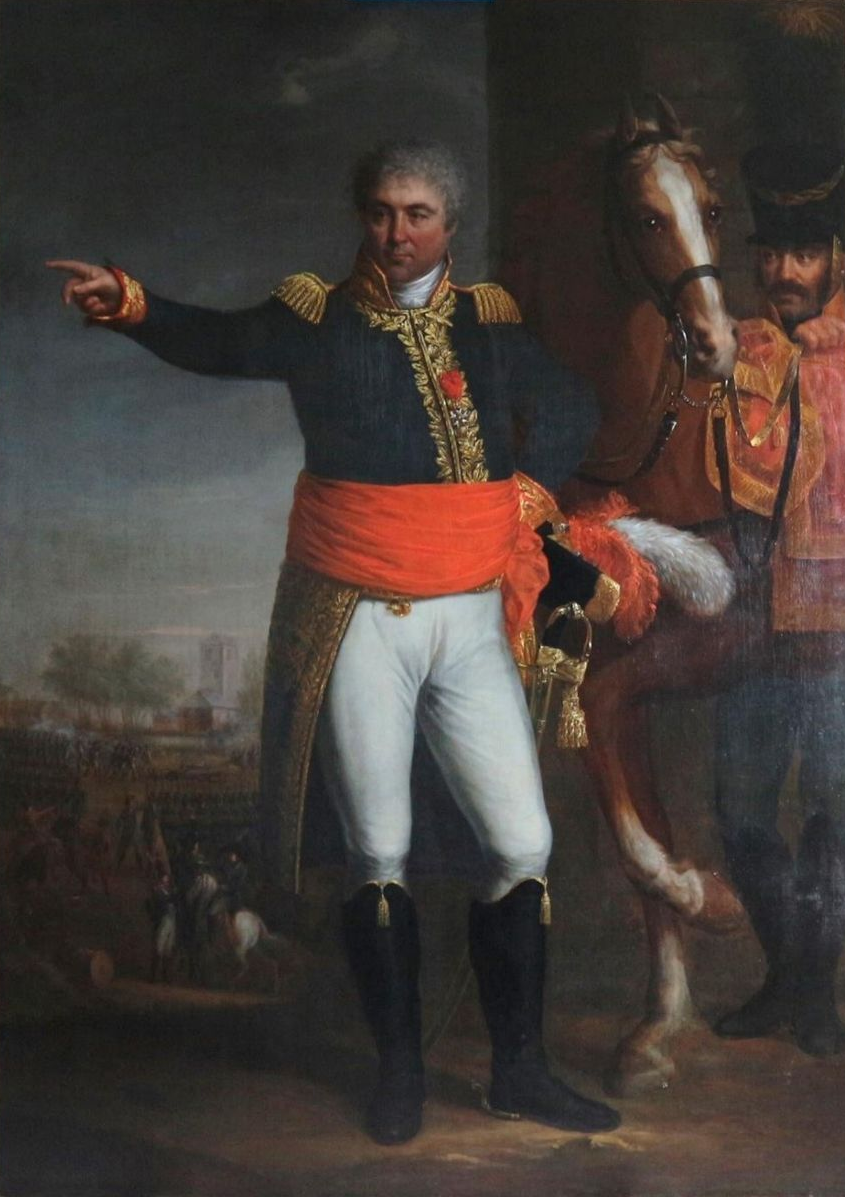
- Anonymous portrait, c. 1805
- Born: 2 August 1754; Les Estables, France
- Died: 23 February 1826 (aged 71); Paris, France
- Burial place: Ablon-sur-Seine, France
- Military career
- Allegiance: (France) French First Republic, (France) First French Empire
- Branch: Infantry
- Service years: 1770–1815
- Rank: General of Division
- Conflicts: French Revolutionary Wars; Battle of Arcole; Siege of Kehl; Battle of Verona; War in the Vendée; Battle of Marengo; Napoleonic Wars
- Awards: Légion d'honneur (Commander); Order of Saint Louis (Knight); Baron of the Empire
- Other work: Mayor of Ablon-sur-Seine

Jean Jacques-Antoine Vital François de Chambarlhac (August 2, 1754 – February 23, 1826) was a French infantry commander during the French Revolutionary and Napoleonic Wars.

== Biography ==
=== Before the French Revolution ===
On May 1, 1769, Chambarlhac enlisted as a soldier in the Régiment d'Auvergne at age 15. On March 26, 1770, he became sub-lieutenant, and left the service four years later on January 1, before returning to service in 1791.

=== French Revolutionary Wars ===
Chambarlhac commanded the 1st Volunteer Battalion of Haute-Loire on June 21, 1792. He served with the Armée des Alpes, commanded by Kellermann, in 1792. In Prairial, year II (1795), he was chief of the 117th semi-brigade of the first formation. Later on 26 Ventôse, year IV, he was the brigadier chief of the 75th semi-brigade of the second formation.

In year IV, as colonel, he fought with Napoleon Bonaparte in 1796–97. He fought in the battle of Arcole in Italy under Napoleon, and participated in the Siege of Kehl. Chambarlhac later returned to Italy in 1799 and fought in the Battle of Verona, serving with Schérer.

=== French Consulate ===
During the Republican Year VIII (1799–1800), the Consular Government sent Chambarlhac into the Vendée against the Chouans, as described in a letter addressed to the first Consul on 8 Pluviôse by Lefebvre (commander of the 15th and 17th military divisions).

Chambarlhac took part in the Battle of Marengo under the command of General Victor. In year X (1800–1801), he was commander of the Fortress of Mainz, and later the 13th military division. On 19 Frimaire, year XII (1802), the first consul nominated him a member of the Legion of Honour and on 25 Prairial, commander of the Order and elector of the Haute-Loire department.

=== First French Empire ===
Chambarlhac commanded the 24th Military Division at Ghent during the ultimately unsuccessful Walcheren Campaign. He was created Baron of the Empire on August 30, 1811. In early 1813, while commander at Brussels, Chambarlhac formed a special corps for soldiers who were separated from their units, and rejoined the army in Saxony.

After the Fall of Paris in 1814, he submitted to the French Provisional Government of 1814. Louis XVIII nominated him the Knight of the Order of Saint Louis on August 21, 1814 and mayor of the village of Ablon (now known as Ablon-sur-Seine).

After the second Bourbon Restoration, he retired from public office. He died in Paris on February 3, 1826.

== Titles ==
- Baron de l'Aubépin and Mont Mézenc, les Estables, Freycenet-la-Tour, Laussonne (Ancien Régime)
- Baron de Laubespin and the Empire (letters patent of August 30, 1811)

== Decorations ==
- Légion d'honneur (Legion of Honour)
  - Legionnaire (19 Frimaire, year XII)
  - Commander of the Legion of Honour (25 Prairial, year XII)
- Royal and Military Order of Saint Louis:
  - Knight (August 21, 1814)

== Bibliography ==
- A. Lievyns, Jean Maurice Verdot, Pierre Bégat, Fastes de la Légion d'honneur : biographie de tous les décorés accompagnée de l'histoire législative et réglementaire de l'ordre, Volume 3, Bureau de l'administration, 1844 (online book)
