= Fort-Louis =

Fort-Louis For-Lui
- Commune
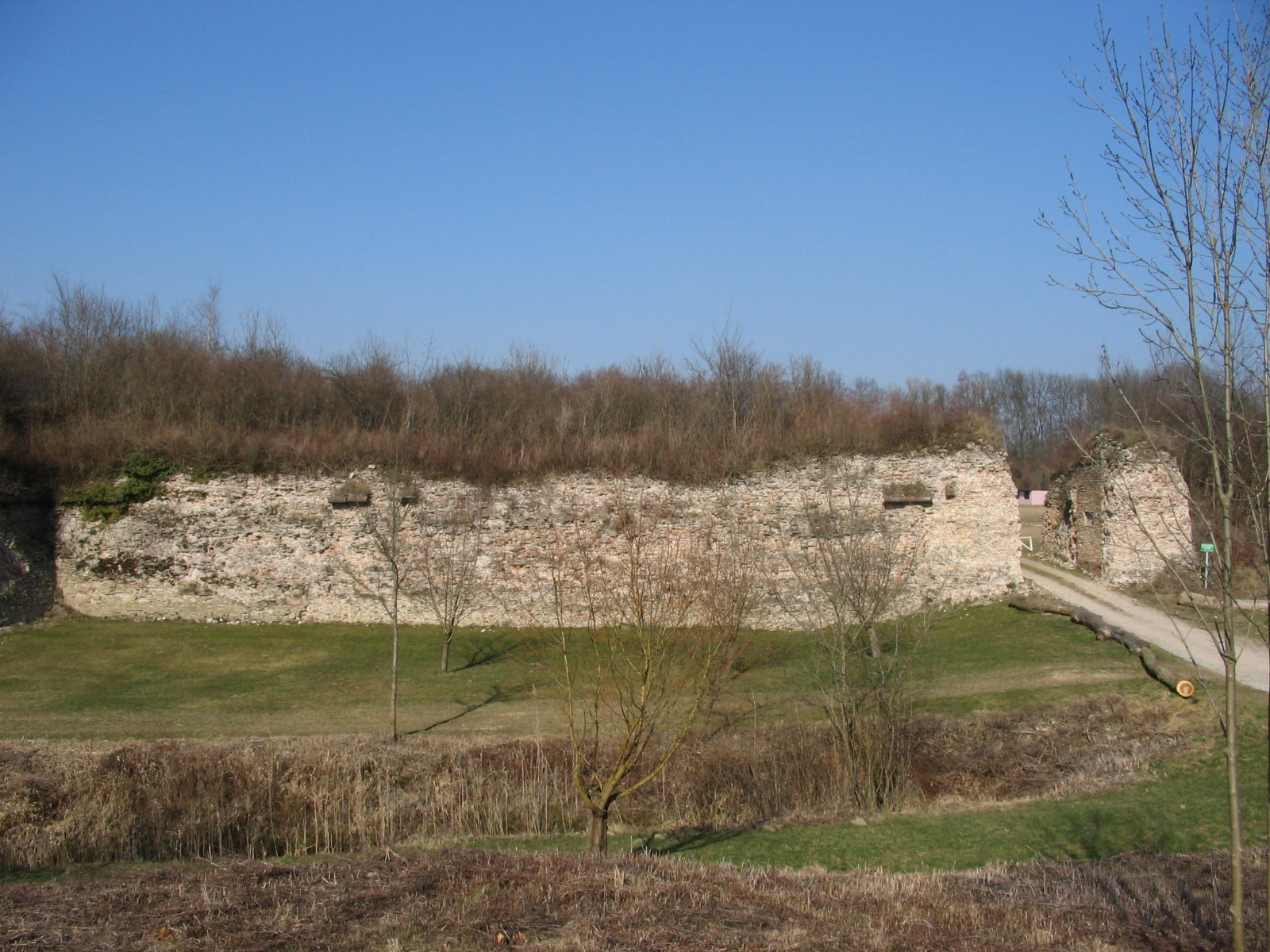
- Southern entrance of Fort Carré in Fort-Louis at the beginning of the 21st century

- Coat of arms
- Location of Fort-Louis
- Location within France Location within Grand Est
- Coordinates: 48°48′07″N 8°03′26″E
- Country: France
- Region: Grand Est
- Department: Bas-Rhin
- Arrondissement: Haguenau-Wissembourg
- Canton: Bischwiller

Government
  - Mayor (2020–2026): Daniel Cousandier
- Area^{1}: 12.31 km^{2} (4.75 sq mi)
- Highest elevation: 122 m (400 ft)
- Lowest elevation: 113 m (371 ft)
- Population (2023): 285
  - Density: 23.2/km^{2} (60.0/sq mi)
- Time zone: UTC+01:00 (CET)
  - Summer (DST): UTC+02:00 (CEST)
- INSEE/Postal code: 67142 /67480
- ^{1} French Land Register data, which excludes lakes, ponds, glaciers > 1 km^{2} (0.386 sq mi or 247 acres) and river estuaries.

Fort-Louis (French pronunciation: [fɔʁ lwi]) is a commune in the Bas-Rhin department in Grand Est in north-eastern France.

It acquired its name and its principal raison d'être from a 17th-century fort, known as Fort Louis. More recently the population of the settlement increased between 1962 and 2004 from 137 to 279.

== History ==
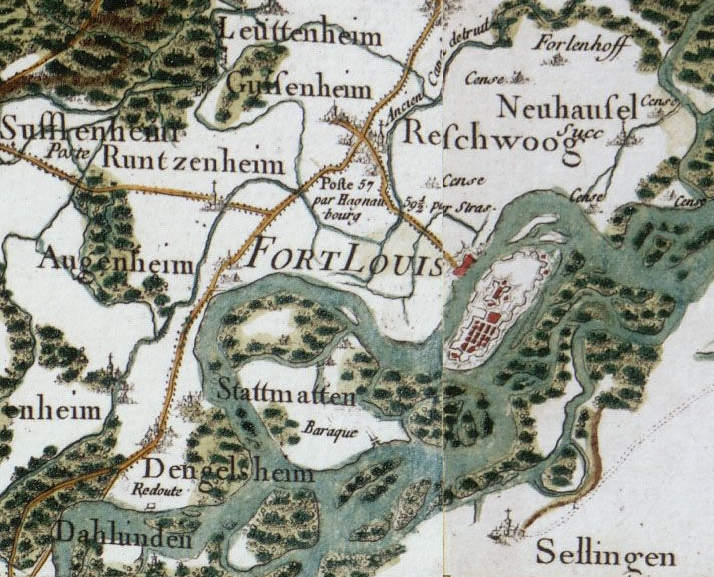
Cassini's map of Fort Louis in the second half of the eighteenth century. The river has subsequently been channeled and the main course of the river, along with the Franco-German frontier, is currently a couple of hundred meters to the east of the fort.

In 1686 the king mandated Vauban to construct a fortification complex at Fort Louis, situated at that time on an island between two branches of the Rhine. The principal fort, to be called the square fort (Fort Carré) was to be backed up by two fortified bridgeheads, one of which, named Fort Alsace, was to be on the Alsace side of the river, and the other of which, Fort Marquisat, was to be on the Baden side of the river. During the course of the Franco-German wars of the 18th century the fort was besieged on several occasions, and following the defeat of Napoleon, the square fort (Fort Carré) was dismantled in 1818. It was later, in 1890, purchased by the commune. Today, little survives beyond earthworks and some sections of wall from Fort Carré and Fort Alsace.

== See also ==
- Communes of the Bas-Rhin department
